

122001–122100 

|-bgcolor=#fefefe
| 122001 ||  || — || March 29, 2000 || Kitt Peak || Spacewatch || — || align=right data-sort-value="0.90" | 900 m || 
|-id=002 bgcolor=#fefefe
| 122002 ||  || — || March 29, 2000 || Kitt Peak || Spacewatch || — || align=right | 1.4 km || 
|-id=003 bgcolor=#fefefe
| 122003 ||  || — || March 29, 2000 || Socorro || LINEAR || — || align=right | 1.5 km || 
|-id=004 bgcolor=#fefefe
| 122004 ||  || — || March 26, 2000 || Anderson Mesa || LONEOS || — || align=right | 1.7 km || 
|-id=005 bgcolor=#fefefe
| 122005 ||  || — || March 30, 2000 || Socorro || LINEAR || — || align=right | 2.4 km || 
|-id=006 bgcolor=#fefefe
| 122006 ||  || — || March 25, 2000 || Kitt Peak || Spacewatch || — || align=right | 1.2 km || 
|-id=007 bgcolor=#fefefe
| 122007 ||  || — || April 4, 2000 || Socorro || LINEAR || NYSslow || align=right | 1.7 km || 
|-id=008 bgcolor=#fefefe
| 122008 ||  || — || April 4, 2000 || Socorro || LINEAR || NYS || align=right | 1.0 km || 
|-id=009 bgcolor=#fefefe
| 122009 ||  || — || April 5, 2000 || Socorro || LINEAR || FLO || align=right | 1.1 km || 
|-id=010 bgcolor=#fefefe
| 122010 ||  || — || April 5, 2000 || Socorro || LINEAR || — || align=right | 1.7 km || 
|-id=011 bgcolor=#fefefe
| 122011 ||  || — || April 5, 2000 || Socorro || LINEAR || NYS || align=right | 1.5 km || 
|-id=012 bgcolor=#fefefe
| 122012 ||  || — || April 5, 2000 || Socorro || LINEAR || — || align=right | 4.3 km || 
|-id=013 bgcolor=#fefefe
| 122013 ||  || — || April 5, 2000 || Socorro || LINEAR || V || align=right | 1.2 km || 
|-id=014 bgcolor=#fefefe
| 122014 ||  || — || April 5, 2000 || Socorro || LINEAR || FLO || align=right | 1.3 km || 
|-id=015 bgcolor=#fefefe
| 122015 ||  || — || April 5, 2000 || Socorro || LINEAR || V || align=right | 1.5 km || 
|-id=016 bgcolor=#fefefe
| 122016 ||  || — || April 5, 2000 || Socorro || LINEAR || — || align=right | 2.0 km || 
|-id=017 bgcolor=#fefefe
| 122017 ||  || — || April 5, 2000 || Socorro || LINEAR || NYS || align=right | 1.6 km || 
|-id=018 bgcolor=#fefefe
| 122018 ||  || — || April 5, 2000 || Socorro || LINEAR || MAS || align=right | 1.2 km || 
|-id=019 bgcolor=#fefefe
| 122019 ||  || — || April 5, 2000 || Socorro || LINEAR || FLO || align=right | 1.3 km || 
|-id=020 bgcolor=#fefefe
| 122020 ||  || — || April 5, 2000 || Socorro || LINEAR || — || align=right | 1.2 km || 
|-id=021 bgcolor=#fefefe
| 122021 ||  || — || April 5, 2000 || Socorro || LINEAR || FLO || align=right | 1.1 km || 
|-id=022 bgcolor=#fefefe
| 122022 ||  || — || April 5, 2000 || Socorro || LINEAR || — || align=right | 1.9 km || 
|-id=023 bgcolor=#fefefe
| 122023 ||  || — || April 5, 2000 || Socorro || LINEAR || — || align=right | 1.1 km || 
|-id=024 bgcolor=#fefefe
| 122024 ||  || — || April 5, 2000 || Socorro || LINEAR || NYS || align=right | 1.3 km || 
|-id=025 bgcolor=#fefefe
| 122025 ||  || — || April 5, 2000 || Socorro || LINEAR || V || align=right | 1.6 km || 
|-id=026 bgcolor=#E9E9E9
| 122026 ||  || — || April 5, 2000 || Socorro || LINEAR || — || align=right | 6.9 km || 
|-id=027 bgcolor=#fefefe
| 122027 ||  || — || April 5, 2000 || Socorro || LINEAR || — || align=right | 2.0 km || 
|-id=028 bgcolor=#fefefe
| 122028 ||  || — || April 5, 2000 || Socorro || LINEAR || V || align=right | 1.2 km || 
|-id=029 bgcolor=#fefefe
| 122029 ||  || — || April 5, 2000 || Socorro || LINEAR || — || align=right | 2.4 km || 
|-id=030 bgcolor=#fefefe
| 122030 ||  || — || April 5, 2000 || Socorro || LINEAR || — || align=right | 1.2 km || 
|-id=031 bgcolor=#fefefe
| 122031 ||  || — || April 5, 2000 || Socorro || LINEAR || — || align=right | 3.1 km || 
|-id=032 bgcolor=#fefefe
| 122032 ||  || — || April 5, 2000 || Socorro || LINEAR || — || align=right | 1.9 km || 
|-id=033 bgcolor=#fefefe
| 122033 ||  || — || April 5, 2000 || Socorro || LINEAR || — || align=right | 1.7 km || 
|-id=034 bgcolor=#fefefe
| 122034 ||  || — || April 5, 2000 || Socorro || LINEAR || — || align=right | 1.9 km || 
|-id=035 bgcolor=#fefefe
| 122035 ||  || — || April 5, 2000 || Socorro || LINEAR || MAS || align=right | 1.5 km || 
|-id=036 bgcolor=#E9E9E9
| 122036 ||  || — || April 5, 2000 || Socorro || LINEAR || — || align=right | 2.5 km || 
|-id=037 bgcolor=#fefefe
| 122037 ||  || — || April 5, 2000 || Socorro || LINEAR || — || align=right | 2.3 km || 
|-id=038 bgcolor=#fefefe
| 122038 ||  || — || April 5, 2000 || Socorro || LINEAR || NYS || align=right | 1.3 km || 
|-id=039 bgcolor=#fefefe
| 122039 ||  || — || April 5, 2000 || Socorro || LINEAR || NYS || align=right | 4.0 km || 
|-id=040 bgcolor=#fefefe
| 122040 ||  || — || April 5, 2000 || Socorro || LINEAR || — || align=right | 1.8 km || 
|-id=041 bgcolor=#fefefe
| 122041 ||  || — || April 5, 2000 || Socorro || LINEAR || — || align=right | 1.7 km || 
|-id=042 bgcolor=#fefefe
| 122042 ||  || — || April 5, 2000 || Socorro || LINEAR || — || align=right | 2.0 km || 
|-id=043 bgcolor=#fefefe
| 122043 ||  || — || April 6, 2000 || Socorro || LINEAR || FLO || align=right | 3.1 km || 
|-id=044 bgcolor=#fefefe
| 122044 ||  || — || April 9, 2000 || Prescott || P. G. Comba || — || align=right | 2.2 km || 
|-id=045 bgcolor=#fefefe
| 122045 ||  || — || April 4, 2000 || Socorro || LINEAR || — || align=right | 2.4 km || 
|-id=046 bgcolor=#fefefe
| 122046 ||  || — || April 4, 2000 || Socorro || LINEAR || — || align=right | 1.8 km || 
|-id=047 bgcolor=#fefefe
| 122047 ||  || — || April 4, 2000 || Socorro || LINEAR || — || align=right | 1.5 km || 
|-id=048 bgcolor=#fefefe
| 122048 ||  || — || April 7, 2000 || Socorro || LINEAR || — || align=right | 2.1 km || 
|-id=049 bgcolor=#fefefe
| 122049 ||  || — || April 3, 2000 || Anderson Mesa || LONEOS || NYS || align=right | 4.5 km || 
|-id=050 bgcolor=#fefefe
| 122050 ||  || — || April 8, 2000 || Socorro || LINEAR || NYS || align=right | 1.5 km || 
|-id=051 bgcolor=#fefefe
| 122051 ||  || — || April 6, 2000 || Kitt Peak || Spacewatch || V || align=right | 1.5 km || 
|-id=052 bgcolor=#fefefe
| 122052 ||  || — || April 7, 2000 || Socorro || LINEAR || V || align=right | 2.9 km || 
|-id=053 bgcolor=#fefefe
| 122053 ||  || — || April 4, 2000 || Anderson Mesa || LONEOS || — || align=right | 2.2 km || 
|-id=054 bgcolor=#fefefe
| 122054 ||  || — || April 6, 2000 || Kitt Peak || Spacewatch || — || align=right | 1.8 km || 
|-id=055 bgcolor=#fefefe
| 122055 ||  || — || April 10, 2000 || Kitt Peak || Spacewatch || V || align=right | 1.3 km || 
|-id=056 bgcolor=#fefefe
| 122056 ||  || — || April 10, 2000 || Kitt Peak || Spacewatch || — || align=right | 1.6 km || 
|-id=057 bgcolor=#fefefe
| 122057 ||  || — || April 5, 2000 || Socorro || LINEAR || — || align=right | 2.1 km || 
|-id=058 bgcolor=#fefefe
| 122058 ||  || — || April 5, 2000 || Socorro || LINEAR || — || align=right data-sort-value="0.85" | 850 m || 
|-id=059 bgcolor=#fefefe
| 122059 ||  || — || April 6, 2000 || Anderson Mesa || LONEOS || V || align=right | 1.2 km || 
|-id=060 bgcolor=#fefefe
| 122060 ||  || — || April 6, 2000 || Socorro || LINEAR || — || align=right | 2.5 km || 
|-id=061 bgcolor=#fefefe
| 122061 ||  || — || April 5, 2000 || Socorro || LINEAR || NYS || align=right | 2.7 km || 
|-id=062 bgcolor=#fefefe
| 122062 ||  || — || April 4, 2000 || Anderson Mesa || LONEOS || NYS || align=right | 1.5 km || 
|-id=063 bgcolor=#fefefe
| 122063 ||  || — || April 5, 2000 || Anderson Mesa || LONEOS || — || align=right | 1.8 km || 
|-id=064 bgcolor=#fefefe
| 122064 ||  || — || April 5, 2000 || Anderson Mesa || LONEOS || — || align=right | 1.2 km || 
|-id=065 bgcolor=#fefefe
| 122065 ||  || — || April 4, 2000 || Socorro || LINEAR || — || align=right | 1.2 km || 
|-id=066 bgcolor=#fefefe
| 122066 ||  || — || April 5, 2000 || Socorro || LINEAR || — || align=right | 1.0 km || 
|-id=067 bgcolor=#fefefe
| 122067 ||  || — || April 27, 2000 || Baton Rouge || W. R. Cooney Jr. || — || align=right | 1.2 km || 
|-id=068 bgcolor=#fefefe
| 122068 ||  || — || April 24, 2000 || Kitt Peak || Spacewatch || NYS || align=right | 1.0 km || 
|-id=069 bgcolor=#fefefe
| 122069 ||  || — || April 24, 2000 || Kitt Peak || Spacewatch || NYS || align=right | 1.4 km || 
|-id=070 bgcolor=#fefefe
| 122070 ||  || — || April 24, 2000 || Kitt Peak || Spacewatch || — || align=right | 1.6 km || 
|-id=071 bgcolor=#fefefe
| 122071 ||  || — || April 27, 2000 || Socorro || LINEAR || NYS || align=right | 1.3 km || 
|-id=072 bgcolor=#fefefe
| 122072 ||  || — || April 25, 2000 || Kitt Peak || Spacewatch || NYS || align=right | 2.9 km || 
|-id=073 bgcolor=#fefefe
| 122073 ||  || — || April 27, 2000 || Socorro || LINEAR || V || align=right | 1.8 km || 
|-id=074 bgcolor=#fefefe
| 122074 ||  || — || April 30, 2000 || Socorro || LINEAR || — || align=right | 1.3 km || 
|-id=075 bgcolor=#fefefe
| 122075 ||  || — || April 30, 2000 || Socorro || LINEAR || V || align=right | 1.2 km || 
|-id=076 bgcolor=#fefefe
| 122076 ||  || — || April 24, 2000 || Anderson Mesa || LONEOS || NYS || align=right | 1.5 km || 
|-id=077 bgcolor=#fefefe
| 122077 ||  || — || April 29, 2000 || Socorro || LINEAR || — || align=right | 1.0 km || 
|-id=078 bgcolor=#fefefe
| 122078 ||  || — || April 29, 2000 || Socorro || LINEAR || MAS || align=right | 1.2 km || 
|-id=079 bgcolor=#fefefe
| 122079 ||  || — || April 25, 2000 || Anderson Mesa || LONEOS || — || align=right | 2.2 km || 
|-id=080 bgcolor=#fefefe
| 122080 ||  || — || April 29, 2000 || Kitt Peak || Spacewatch || — || align=right | 1.9 km || 
|-id=081 bgcolor=#fefefe
| 122081 ||  || — || April 29, 2000 || Kitt Peak || Spacewatch || — || align=right | 1.2 km || 
|-id=082 bgcolor=#fefefe
| 122082 ||  || — || April 28, 2000 || Socorro || LINEAR || — || align=right | 3.0 km || 
|-id=083 bgcolor=#fefefe
| 122083 ||  || — || April 25, 2000 || Anderson Mesa || LONEOS || — || align=right | 2.0 km || 
|-id=084 bgcolor=#fefefe
| 122084 ||  || — || April 26, 2000 || Anderson Mesa || LONEOS || FLO || align=right data-sort-value="0.99" | 990 m || 
|-id=085 bgcolor=#fefefe
| 122085 ||  || — || April 26, 2000 || Anderson Mesa || LONEOS || — || align=right | 1.5 km || 
|-id=086 bgcolor=#fefefe
| 122086 ||  || — || April 26, 2000 || Anderson Mesa || LONEOS || — || align=right | 1.5 km || 
|-id=087 bgcolor=#fefefe
| 122087 ||  || — || April 29, 2000 || Socorro || LINEAR || — || align=right | 1.3 km || 
|-id=088 bgcolor=#fefefe
| 122088 ||  || — || April 29, 2000 || Socorro || LINEAR || V || align=right | 1.4 km || 
|-id=089 bgcolor=#fefefe
| 122089 ||  || — || April 29, 2000 || Socorro || LINEAR || — || align=right | 2.1 km || 
|-id=090 bgcolor=#fefefe
| 122090 ||  || — || April 29, 2000 || Socorro || LINEAR || — || align=right | 2.0 km || 
|-id=091 bgcolor=#fefefe
| 122091 ||  || — || April 29, 2000 || Socorro || LINEAR || MAS || align=right | 1.5 km || 
|-id=092 bgcolor=#fefefe
| 122092 ||  || — || April 29, 2000 || Socorro || LINEAR || — || align=right | 2.5 km || 
|-id=093 bgcolor=#E9E9E9
| 122093 ||  || — || April 25, 2000 || Anderson Mesa || LONEOS || — || align=right | 2.6 km || 
|-id=094 bgcolor=#fefefe
| 122094 ||  || — || April 25, 2000 || Anderson Mesa || LONEOS || NYS || align=right | 1.2 km || 
|-id=095 bgcolor=#fefefe
| 122095 ||  || — || April 25, 2000 || Kitt Peak || Spacewatch || NYS || align=right | 1.1 km || 
|-id=096 bgcolor=#fefefe
| 122096 ||  || — || April 26, 2000 || Anderson Mesa || LONEOS || NYS || align=right | 2.8 km || 
|-id=097 bgcolor=#fefefe
| 122097 ||  || — || April 26, 2000 || Anderson Mesa || LONEOS || NYS || align=right | 1.5 km || 
|-id=098 bgcolor=#fefefe
| 122098 ||  || — || April 26, 2000 || Anderson Mesa || LONEOS || — || align=right | 1.6 km || 
|-id=099 bgcolor=#fefefe
| 122099 ||  || — || April 24, 2000 || Anderson Mesa || LONEOS || — || align=right | 1.2 km || 
|-id=100 bgcolor=#fefefe
| 122100 ||  || — || April 24, 2000 || Anderson Mesa || LONEOS || — || align=right | 1.8 km || 
|}

122101–122200 

|-bgcolor=#fefefe
| 122101 ||  || — || April 25, 2000 || Anderson Mesa || LONEOS || V || align=right | 1.4 km || 
|-id=102 bgcolor=#fefefe
| 122102 ||  || — || April 27, 2000 || Socorro || LINEAR || V || align=right | 1.6 km || 
|-id=103 bgcolor=#fefefe
| 122103 ||  || — || April 27, 2000 || Socorro || LINEAR || FLO || align=right | 1.9 km || 
|-id=104 bgcolor=#fefefe
| 122104 ||  || — || April 30, 2000 || Haleakala || NEAT || V || align=right | 1.4 km || 
|-id=105 bgcolor=#fefefe
| 122105 ||  || — || April 30, 2000 || Anderson Mesa || LONEOS || — || align=right | 1.6 km || 
|-id=106 bgcolor=#FA8072
| 122106 ||  || — || April 30, 2000 || Anderson Mesa || LONEOS || — || align=right | 1.7 km || 
|-id=107 bgcolor=#E9E9E9
| 122107 ||  || — || April 29, 2000 || Socorro || LINEAR || — || align=right | 1.7 km || 
|-id=108 bgcolor=#fefefe
| 122108 ||  || — || April 29, 2000 || Socorro || LINEAR || NYS || align=right | 1.3 km || 
|-id=109 bgcolor=#fefefe
| 122109 ||  || — || April 29, 2000 || Socorro || LINEAR || SUL || align=right | 3.1 km || 
|-id=110 bgcolor=#fefefe
| 122110 ||  || — || April 28, 2000 || Socorro || LINEAR || FLO || align=right | 1.8 km || 
|-id=111 bgcolor=#fefefe
| 122111 ||  || — || April 26, 2000 || Anderson Mesa || LONEOS || V || align=right | 1.3 km || 
|-id=112 bgcolor=#fefefe
| 122112 ||  || — || May 1, 2000 || Socorro || LINEAR || — || align=right | 2.0 km || 
|-id=113 bgcolor=#fefefe
| 122113 ||  || — || May 3, 2000 || Socorro || LINEAR || PHO || align=right | 2.1 km || 
|-id=114 bgcolor=#fefefe
| 122114 ||  || — || May 5, 2000 || Socorro || LINEAR || FLO || align=right | 1.0 km || 
|-id=115 bgcolor=#fefefe
| 122115 ||  || — || May 5, 2000 || Socorro || LINEAR || FLO || align=right | 2.1 km || 
|-id=116 bgcolor=#fefefe
| 122116 ||  || — || May 5, 2000 || Socorro || LINEAR || — || align=right | 2.3 km || 
|-id=117 bgcolor=#fefefe
| 122117 ||  || — || May 6, 2000 || Socorro || LINEAR || — || align=right | 2.4 km || 
|-id=118 bgcolor=#fefefe
| 122118 ||  || — || May 6, 2000 || Socorro || LINEAR || — || align=right | 1.1 km || 
|-id=119 bgcolor=#FA8072
| 122119 ||  || — || May 6, 2000 || Socorro || LINEAR || — || align=right | 1.5 km || 
|-id=120 bgcolor=#fefefe
| 122120 ||  || — || May 6, 2000 || Socorro || LINEAR || — || align=right | 1.4 km || 
|-id=121 bgcolor=#fefefe
| 122121 ||  || — || May 3, 2000 || Socorro || LINEAR || — || align=right | 2.0 km || 
|-id=122 bgcolor=#fefefe
| 122122 ||  || — || May 5, 2000 || Socorro || LINEAR || V || align=right | 1.9 km || 
|-id=123 bgcolor=#fefefe
| 122123 ||  || — || May 5, 2000 || Socorro || LINEAR || NYS || align=right | 1.5 km || 
|-id=124 bgcolor=#fefefe
| 122124 ||  || — || May 5, 2000 || Socorro || LINEAR || V || align=right | 1.3 km || 
|-id=125 bgcolor=#fefefe
| 122125 ||  || — || May 6, 2000 || Socorro || LINEAR || V || align=right | 1.7 km || 
|-id=126 bgcolor=#fefefe
| 122126 ||  || — || May 4, 2000 || Socorro || LINEAR || FLO || align=right | 2.1 km || 
|-id=127 bgcolor=#E9E9E9
| 122127 ||  || — || May 4, 2000 || Socorro || LINEAR || — || align=right | 5.3 km || 
|-id=128 bgcolor=#fefefe
| 122128 ||  || — || May 6, 2000 || Socorro || LINEAR || NYS || align=right | 2.7 km || 
|-id=129 bgcolor=#fefefe
| 122129 ||  || — || May 6, 2000 || Socorro || LINEAR || NYS || align=right | 1.6 km || 
|-id=130 bgcolor=#fefefe
| 122130 ||  || — || May 7, 2000 || Socorro || LINEAR || — || align=right | 1.4 km || 
|-id=131 bgcolor=#fefefe
| 122131 ||  || — || May 7, 2000 || Socorro || LINEAR || — || align=right | 1.7 km || 
|-id=132 bgcolor=#fefefe
| 122132 ||  || — || May 7, 2000 || Socorro || LINEAR || — || align=right | 1.4 km || 
|-id=133 bgcolor=#fefefe
| 122133 ||  || — || May 7, 2000 || Socorro || LINEAR || — || align=right | 1.7 km || 
|-id=134 bgcolor=#fefefe
| 122134 ||  || — || May 7, 2000 || Socorro || LINEAR || V || align=right | 1.2 km || 
|-id=135 bgcolor=#fefefe
| 122135 ||  || — || May 7, 2000 || Socorro || LINEAR || — || align=right | 1.4 km || 
|-id=136 bgcolor=#fefefe
| 122136 ||  || — || May 7, 2000 || Socorro || LINEAR || NYS || align=right | 1.6 km || 
|-id=137 bgcolor=#fefefe
| 122137 ||  || — || May 7, 2000 || Socorro || LINEAR || — || align=right | 2.5 km || 
|-id=138 bgcolor=#fefefe
| 122138 ||  || — || May 7, 2000 || Socorro || LINEAR || — || align=right | 2.2 km || 
|-id=139 bgcolor=#fefefe
| 122139 ||  || — || May 7, 2000 || Socorro || LINEAR || MAS || align=right | 1.6 km || 
|-id=140 bgcolor=#d6d6d6
| 122140 ||  || — || May 5, 2000 || Socorro || LINEAR || — || align=right | 5.7 km || 
|-id=141 bgcolor=#fefefe
| 122141 ||  || — || May 7, 2000 || Socorro || LINEAR || V || align=right | 1.7 km || 
|-id=142 bgcolor=#fefefe
| 122142 ||  || — || May 7, 2000 || Socorro || LINEAR || MAS || align=right | 1.1 km || 
|-id=143 bgcolor=#fefefe
| 122143 ||  || — || May 7, 2000 || Socorro || LINEAR || MAS || align=right | 1.3 km || 
|-id=144 bgcolor=#fefefe
| 122144 ||  || — || May 7, 2000 || Socorro || LINEAR || NYS || align=right | 1.1 km || 
|-id=145 bgcolor=#fefefe
| 122145 ||  || — || May 7, 2000 || Socorro || LINEAR || — || align=right | 1.0 km || 
|-id=146 bgcolor=#fefefe
| 122146 ||  || — || May 7, 2000 || Socorro || LINEAR || MAS || align=right | 1.6 km || 
|-id=147 bgcolor=#fefefe
| 122147 ||  || — || May 7, 2000 || Socorro || LINEAR || — || align=right | 3.7 km || 
|-id=148 bgcolor=#fefefe
| 122148 ||  || — || May 7, 2000 || Socorro || LINEAR || NYS || align=right | 1.2 km || 
|-id=149 bgcolor=#fefefe
| 122149 ||  || — || May 7, 2000 || Socorro || LINEAR || — || align=right | 1.1 km || 
|-id=150 bgcolor=#fefefe
| 122150 ||  || — || May 7, 2000 || Socorro || LINEAR || V || align=right | 1.4 km || 
|-id=151 bgcolor=#E9E9E9
| 122151 ||  || — || May 7, 2000 || Socorro || LINEAR || — || align=right | 2.1 km || 
|-id=152 bgcolor=#fefefe
| 122152 ||  || — || May 9, 2000 || Socorro || LINEAR || — || align=right | 1.3 km || 
|-id=153 bgcolor=#E9E9E9
| 122153 ||  || — || May 6, 2000 || Socorro || LINEAR || — || align=right | 3.5 km || 
|-id=154 bgcolor=#fefefe
| 122154 ||  || — || May 7, 2000 || Socorro || LINEAR || V || align=right | 1.8 km || 
|-id=155 bgcolor=#fefefe
| 122155 ||  || — || May 7, 2000 || Socorro || LINEAR || — || align=right | 1.6 km || 
|-id=156 bgcolor=#E9E9E9
| 122156 ||  || — || May 2, 2000 || Anderson Mesa || LONEOS || MIT || align=right | 3.5 km || 
|-id=157 bgcolor=#fefefe
| 122157 ||  || — || May 2, 2000 || Anderson Mesa || LONEOS || — || align=right | 2.3 km || 
|-id=158 bgcolor=#fefefe
| 122158 ||  || — || May 4, 2000 || Anderson Mesa || LONEOS || — || align=right | 5.4 km || 
|-id=159 bgcolor=#FA8072
| 122159 ||  || — || May 9, 2000 || Socorro || LINEAR || — || align=right | 1.7 km || 
|-id=160 bgcolor=#fefefe
| 122160 ||  || — || May 7, 2000 || Socorro || LINEAR || — || align=right | 1.5 km || 
|-id=161 bgcolor=#fefefe
| 122161 ||  || — || May 13, 2000 || Kitt Peak || Spacewatch || — || align=right | 1.5 km || 
|-id=162 bgcolor=#E9E9E9
| 122162 ||  || — || May 26, 2000 || Prescott || P. G. Comba || RAF || align=right | 1.8 km || 
|-id=163 bgcolor=#fefefe
| 122163 ||  || — || May 27, 2000 || Črni Vrh || Črni Vrh || — || align=right | 1.6 km || 
|-id=164 bgcolor=#E9E9E9
| 122164 ||  || — || May 27, 2000 || Socorro || LINEAR || — || align=right | 6.4 km || 
|-id=165 bgcolor=#E9E9E9
| 122165 ||  || — || May 27, 2000 || Socorro || LINEAR || — || align=right | 1.7 km || 
|-id=166 bgcolor=#E9E9E9
| 122166 ||  || — || May 27, 2000 || Socorro || LINEAR || — || align=right | 3.8 km || 
|-id=167 bgcolor=#E9E9E9
| 122167 ||  || — || May 27, 2000 || Socorro || LINEAR || — || align=right | 3.5 km || 
|-id=168 bgcolor=#fefefe
| 122168 ||  || — || May 28, 2000 || Socorro || LINEAR || NYS || align=right | 2.0 km || 
|-id=169 bgcolor=#fefefe
| 122169 ||  || — || May 28, 2000 || Socorro || LINEAR || — || align=right | 1.6 km || 
|-id=170 bgcolor=#fefefe
| 122170 ||  || — || May 28, 2000 || Socorro || LINEAR || V || align=right | 1.3 km || 
|-id=171 bgcolor=#fefefe
| 122171 ||  || — || May 28, 2000 || Socorro || LINEAR || — || align=right | 1.9 km || 
|-id=172 bgcolor=#fefefe
| 122172 ||  || — || May 28, 2000 || Socorro || LINEAR || — || align=right | 1.4 km || 
|-id=173 bgcolor=#fefefe
| 122173 ||  || — || May 28, 2000 || Socorro || LINEAR || V || align=right | 1.1 km || 
|-id=174 bgcolor=#fefefe
| 122174 ||  || — || May 28, 2000 || Socorro || LINEAR || — || align=right | 1.9 km || 
|-id=175 bgcolor=#fefefe
| 122175 ||  || — || May 27, 2000 || Socorro || LINEAR || NYS || align=right | 1.6 km || 
|-id=176 bgcolor=#E9E9E9
| 122176 ||  || — || May 27, 2000 || Socorro || LINEAR || — || align=right | 2.1 km || 
|-id=177 bgcolor=#fefefe
| 122177 ||  || — || May 27, 2000 || Socorro || LINEAR || FLO || align=right | 1.4 km || 
|-id=178 bgcolor=#E9E9E9
| 122178 ||  || — || May 24, 2000 || Kitt Peak || Spacewatch || — || align=right | 3.4 km || 
|-id=179 bgcolor=#fefefe
| 122179 ||  || — || May 24, 2000 || Kitt Peak || Spacewatch || Vfast? || align=right | 1.3 km || 
|-id=180 bgcolor=#FA8072
| 122180 ||  || — || May 28, 2000 || Socorro || LINEAR || — || align=right data-sort-value="0.96" | 960 m || 
|-id=181 bgcolor=#E9E9E9
| 122181 ||  || — || May 27, 2000 || Socorro || LINEAR || — || align=right | 2.4 km || 
|-id=182 bgcolor=#fefefe
| 122182 ||  || — || May 30, 2000 || Kitt Peak || Spacewatch || NYS || align=right | 2.3 km || 
|-id=183 bgcolor=#fefefe
| 122183 ||  || — || May 24, 2000 || Anderson Mesa || LONEOS || FLO || align=right | 1.1 km || 
|-id=184 bgcolor=#fefefe
| 122184 ||  || — || May 24, 2000 || Anderson Mesa || LONEOS || fast? || align=right | 1.8 km || 
|-id=185 bgcolor=#fefefe
| 122185 ||  || — || May 24, 2000 || Anderson Mesa || LONEOS || V || align=right | 1.3 km || 
|-id=186 bgcolor=#E9E9E9
| 122186 ||  || — || May 25, 2000 || Anderson Mesa || LONEOS || — || align=right | 3.6 km || 
|-id=187 bgcolor=#fefefe
| 122187 ||  || — || May 26, 2000 || Kitt Peak || Spacewatch || — || align=right | 3.0 km || 
|-id=188 bgcolor=#fefefe
| 122188 ||  || — || May 26, 2000 || Anderson Mesa || LONEOS || V || align=right | 1.8 km || 
|-id=189 bgcolor=#E9E9E9
| 122189 ||  || — || May 28, 2000 || Socorro || LINEAR || — || align=right | 1.8 km || 
|-id=190 bgcolor=#fefefe
| 122190 ||  || — || May 27, 2000 || Socorro || LINEAR || NYS || align=right | 3.1 km || 
|-id=191 bgcolor=#fefefe
| 122191 ||  || — || May 27, 2000 || Socorro || LINEAR || — || align=right | 1.4 km || 
|-id=192 bgcolor=#fefefe
| 122192 ||  || — || May 24, 2000 || Kitt Peak || Spacewatch || FLO || align=right | 1.5 km || 
|-id=193 bgcolor=#fefefe
| 122193 ||  || — || June 2, 2000 || Črni Vrh || Črni Vrh || — || align=right | 2.6 km || 
|-id=194 bgcolor=#fefefe
| 122194 ||  || — || June 1, 2000 || Haleakala || NEAT || — || align=right | 1.7 km || 
|-id=195 bgcolor=#fefefe
| 122195 ||  || — || June 4, 2000 || Farpoint || G. Hug || — || align=right | 2.0 km || 
|-id=196 bgcolor=#fefefe
| 122196 ||  || — || June 6, 2000 || Kitt Peak || Spacewatch || FLO || align=right | 1.5 km || 
|-id=197 bgcolor=#fefefe
| 122197 ||  || — || June 1, 2000 || Socorro || LINEAR || — || align=right | 1.5 km || 
|-id=198 bgcolor=#fefefe
| 122198 ||  || — || June 7, 2000 || Socorro || LINEAR || PHO || align=right | 2.4 km || 
|-id=199 bgcolor=#E9E9E9
| 122199 ||  || — || June 8, 2000 || Socorro || LINEAR || — || align=right | 3.2 km || 
|-id=200 bgcolor=#fefefe
| 122200 ||  || — || June 8, 2000 || Socorro || LINEAR || PHO || align=right | 2.8 km || 
|}

122201–122300 

|-bgcolor=#E9E9E9
| 122201 ||  || — || June 8, 2000 || Socorro || LINEAR || ADE || align=right | 4.8 km || 
|-id=202 bgcolor=#fefefe
| 122202 ||  || — || June 8, 2000 || Socorro || LINEAR || FLO || align=right | 1.5 km || 
|-id=203 bgcolor=#E9E9E9
| 122203 ||  || — || June 1, 2000 || Anderson Mesa || LONEOS || — || align=right | 3.1 km || 
|-id=204 bgcolor=#fefefe
| 122204 ||  || — || June 6, 2000 || Anderson Mesa || LONEOS || — || align=right | 1.4 km || 
|-id=205 bgcolor=#fefefe
| 122205 ||  || — || June 8, 2000 || Socorro || LINEAR || — || align=right | 1.7 km || 
|-id=206 bgcolor=#E9E9E9
| 122206 ||  || — || June 6, 2000 || Anderson Mesa || LONEOS || EUN || align=right | 3.1 km || 
|-id=207 bgcolor=#fefefe
| 122207 ||  || — || June 4, 2000 || Socorro || LINEAR || V || align=right | 1.4 km || 
|-id=208 bgcolor=#E9E9E9
| 122208 ||  || — || June 1, 2000 || Anderson Mesa || LONEOS || — || align=right | 4.2 km || 
|-id=209 bgcolor=#E9E9E9
| 122209 ||  || — || June 27, 2000 || Reedy Creek || J. Broughton || — || align=right | 2.1 km || 
|-id=210 bgcolor=#E9E9E9
| 122210 ||  || — || July 7, 2000 || Črni Vrh || Črni Vrh || — || align=right | 3.8 km || 
|-id=211 bgcolor=#fefefe
| 122211 ||  || — || July 3, 2000 || Kitt Peak || Spacewatch || — || align=right | 1.9 km || 
|-id=212 bgcolor=#fefefe
| 122212 ||  || — || July 3, 2000 || Kitt Peak || Spacewatch || — || align=right | 1.2 km || 
|-id=213 bgcolor=#fefefe
| 122213 ||  || — || July 4, 2000 || Kitt Peak || Spacewatch || — || align=right | 1.4 km || 
|-id=214 bgcolor=#E9E9E9
| 122214 ||  || — || July 4, 2000 || Kitt Peak || Spacewatch || — || align=right | 2.2 km || 
|-id=215 bgcolor=#E9E9E9
| 122215 ||  || — || July 1, 2000 || Siding Spring || R. H. McNaught || — || align=right | 2.9 km || 
|-id=216 bgcolor=#E9E9E9
| 122216 ||  || — || July 5, 2000 || Anderson Mesa || LONEOS || JUN || align=right | 2.7 km || 
|-id=217 bgcolor=#E9E9E9
| 122217 ||  || — || July 5, 2000 || Anderson Mesa || LONEOS || — || align=right | 2.2 km || 
|-id=218 bgcolor=#fefefe
| 122218 ||  || — || July 5, 2000 || Anderson Mesa || LONEOS || NYS || align=right | 2.8 km || 
|-id=219 bgcolor=#fefefe
| 122219 ||  || — || July 5, 2000 || Anderson Mesa || LONEOS || V || align=right | 1.9 km || 
|-id=220 bgcolor=#fefefe
| 122220 ||  || — || July 5, 2000 || Anderson Mesa || LONEOS || — || align=right | 2.5 km || 
|-id=221 bgcolor=#E9E9E9
| 122221 ||  || — || July 6, 2000 || Kitt Peak || Spacewatch || — || align=right | 3.1 km || 
|-id=222 bgcolor=#fefefe
| 122222 ||  || — || July 7, 2000 || Socorro || LINEAR || — || align=right | 1.6 km || 
|-id=223 bgcolor=#E9E9E9
| 122223 ||  || — || July 7, 2000 || Anderson Mesa || LONEOS || EUN || align=right | 2.7 km || 
|-id=224 bgcolor=#fefefe
| 122224 ||  || — || July 5, 2000 || Anderson Mesa || LONEOS || FLO || align=right | 1.7 km || 
|-id=225 bgcolor=#fefefe
| 122225 ||  || — || July 4, 2000 || Anderson Mesa || LONEOS || — || align=right | 1.9 km || 
|-id=226 bgcolor=#E9E9E9
| 122226 ||  || — || July 4, 2000 || Anderson Mesa || LONEOS || — || align=right | 2.7 km || 
|-id=227 bgcolor=#E9E9E9
| 122227 || 2000 OJ || — || July 22, 2000 || Socorro || LINEAR || BAR || align=right | 2.7 km || 
|-id=228 bgcolor=#E9E9E9
| 122228 ||  || — || July 27, 2000 || Prescott || P. G. Comba || — || align=right | 2.3 km || 
|-id=229 bgcolor=#fefefe
| 122229 ||  || — || July 27, 2000 || Prescott || P. G. Comba || — || align=right | 1.5 km || 
|-id=230 bgcolor=#E9E9E9
| 122230 ||  || — || July 24, 2000 || Socorro || LINEAR || — || align=right | 2.1 km || 
|-id=231 bgcolor=#E9E9E9
| 122231 ||  || — || July 24, 2000 || Socorro || LINEAR || — || align=right | 6.4 km || 
|-id=232 bgcolor=#E9E9E9
| 122232 ||  || — || July 24, 2000 || Socorro || LINEAR || — || align=right | 4.6 km || 
|-id=233 bgcolor=#fefefe
| 122233 ||  || — || July 29, 2000 || Lake Tekapo || Mount John Obs. || — || align=right | 3.9 km || 
|-id=234 bgcolor=#E9E9E9
| 122234 ||  || — || July 30, 2000 || Socorro || LINEAR || BAR || align=right | 3.1 km || 
|-id=235 bgcolor=#E9E9E9
| 122235 ||  || — || July 23, 2000 || Socorro || LINEAR || — || align=right | 3.2 km || 
|-id=236 bgcolor=#fefefe
| 122236 ||  || — || July 23, 2000 || Socorro || LINEAR || — || align=right | 1.3 km || 
|-id=237 bgcolor=#fefefe
| 122237 ||  || — || July 23, 2000 || Socorro || LINEAR || — || align=right | 1.5 km || 
|-id=238 bgcolor=#E9E9E9
| 122238 ||  || — || July 23, 2000 || Socorro || LINEAR || ADE || align=right | 3.9 km || 
|-id=239 bgcolor=#fefefe
| 122239 ||  || — || July 23, 2000 || Socorro || LINEAR || NYS || align=right | 1.4 km || 
|-id=240 bgcolor=#E9E9E9
| 122240 ||  || — || July 23, 2000 || Socorro || LINEAR || — || align=right | 2.0 km || 
|-id=241 bgcolor=#fefefe
| 122241 ||  || — || July 23, 2000 || Socorro || LINEAR || FLO || align=right | 1.4 km || 
|-id=242 bgcolor=#E9E9E9
| 122242 ||  || — || July 23, 2000 || Socorro || LINEAR || — || align=right | 2.5 km || 
|-id=243 bgcolor=#fefefe
| 122243 ||  || — || July 23, 2000 || Socorro || LINEAR || — || align=right | 1.9 km || 
|-id=244 bgcolor=#E9E9E9
| 122244 ||  || — || July 30, 2000 || Socorro || LINEAR || — || align=right | 2.5 km || 
|-id=245 bgcolor=#fefefe
| 122245 ||  || — || July 30, 2000 || Socorro || LINEAR || PHO || align=right | 3.7 km || 
|-id=246 bgcolor=#E9E9E9
| 122246 ||  || — || July 30, 2000 || Socorro || LINEAR || BRU || align=right | 4.5 km || 
|-id=247 bgcolor=#E9E9E9
| 122247 ||  || — || July 23, 2000 || Socorro || LINEAR || — || align=right | 2.9 km || 
|-id=248 bgcolor=#E9E9E9
| 122248 ||  || — || July 30, 2000 || Socorro || LINEAR || — || align=right | 3.2 km || 
|-id=249 bgcolor=#E9E9E9
| 122249 ||  || — || July 30, 2000 || Socorro || LINEAR || DOR || align=right | 4.9 km || 
|-id=250 bgcolor=#E9E9E9
| 122250 ||  || — || July 30, 2000 || Socorro || LINEAR || — || align=right | 3.2 km || 
|-id=251 bgcolor=#E9E9E9
| 122251 ||  || — || July 30, 2000 || Socorro || LINEAR || MAR || align=right | 2.4 km || 
|-id=252 bgcolor=#E9E9E9
| 122252 ||  || — || July 30, 2000 || Socorro || LINEAR || EUN || align=right | 2.4 km || 
|-id=253 bgcolor=#E9E9E9
| 122253 ||  || — || July 30, 2000 || Socorro || LINEAR || — || align=right | 2.1 km || 
|-id=254 bgcolor=#E9E9E9
| 122254 ||  || — || July 30, 2000 || Socorro || LINEAR || ADE || align=right | 3.4 km || 
|-id=255 bgcolor=#E9E9E9
| 122255 ||  || — || July 30, 2000 || Socorro || LINEAR || — || align=right | 5.7 km || 
|-id=256 bgcolor=#fefefe
| 122256 ||  || — || July 30, 2000 || Socorro || LINEAR || — || align=right | 6.0 km || 
|-id=257 bgcolor=#E9E9E9
| 122257 ||  || — || July 30, 2000 || Socorro || LINEAR || — || align=right | 3.2 km || 
|-id=258 bgcolor=#FA8072
| 122258 ||  || — || July 30, 2000 || Socorro || LINEAR || — || align=right | 2.2 km || 
|-id=259 bgcolor=#FA8072
| 122259 ||  || — || July 30, 2000 || Socorro || LINEAR || — || align=right | 1.9 km || 
|-id=260 bgcolor=#E9E9E9
| 122260 ||  || — || July 30, 2000 || Socorro || LINEAR || — || align=right | 3.3 km || 
|-id=261 bgcolor=#fefefe
| 122261 ||  || — || July 30, 2000 || Socorro || LINEAR || — || align=right | 2.8 km || 
|-id=262 bgcolor=#fefefe
| 122262 ||  || — || July 31, 2000 || Socorro || LINEAR || — || align=right | 1.9 km || 
|-id=263 bgcolor=#fefefe
| 122263 ||  || — || July 31, 2000 || Socorro || LINEAR || — || align=right | 5.5 km || 
|-id=264 bgcolor=#fefefe
| 122264 ||  || — || July 31, 2000 || Socorro || LINEAR || V || align=right | 2.0 km || 
|-id=265 bgcolor=#fefefe
| 122265 ||  || — || July 31, 2000 || Socorro || LINEAR || NYS || align=right | 1.8 km || 
|-id=266 bgcolor=#E9E9E9
| 122266 ||  || — || July 30, 2000 || Socorro || LINEAR || JUN || align=right | 1.9 km || 
|-id=267 bgcolor=#fefefe
| 122267 ||  || — || July 29, 2000 || Anderson Mesa || LONEOS || — || align=right | 2.5 km || 
|-id=268 bgcolor=#E9E9E9
| 122268 ||  || — || July 29, 2000 || Anderson Mesa || LONEOS || — || align=right | 2.7 km || 
|-id=269 bgcolor=#fefefe
| 122269 ||  || — || July 29, 2000 || Anderson Mesa || LONEOS || — || align=right | 1.6 km || 
|-id=270 bgcolor=#E9E9E9
| 122270 ||  || — || July 29, 2000 || Anderson Mesa || LONEOS || — || align=right | 1.8 km || 
|-id=271 bgcolor=#E9E9E9
| 122271 ||  || — || July 30, 2000 || Socorro || LINEAR || MAR || align=right | 3.4 km || 
|-id=272 bgcolor=#E9E9E9
| 122272 || 2000 PV || — || August 1, 2000 || Socorro || LINEAR || — || align=right | 3.2 km || 
|-id=273 bgcolor=#E9E9E9
| 122273 ||  || — || August 3, 2000 || Prescott || P. G. Comba || — || align=right | 1.6 km || 
|-id=274 bgcolor=#fefefe
| 122274 ||  || — || August 1, 2000 || Črni Vrh || Črni Vrh || FLO || align=right | 1.3 km || 
|-id=275 bgcolor=#fefefe
| 122275 ||  || — || August 1, 2000 || Socorro || LINEAR || MAS || align=right | 1.6 km || 
|-id=276 bgcolor=#fefefe
| 122276 ||  || — || August 1, 2000 || Socorro || LINEAR || — || align=right | 1.6 km || 
|-id=277 bgcolor=#E9E9E9
| 122277 ||  || — || August 4, 2000 || Haleakala || NEAT || PAL || align=right | 3.9 km || 
|-id=278 bgcolor=#fefefe
| 122278 ||  || — || August 5, 2000 || Haleakala || NEAT || — || align=right | 1.3 km || 
|-id=279 bgcolor=#E9E9E9
| 122279 ||  || — || August 6, 2000 || Bisei SG Center || BATTeRS || — || align=right | 4.2 km || 
|-id=280 bgcolor=#fefefe
| 122280 ||  || — || August 8, 2000 || Ondřejov || L. Kotková || — || align=right | 1.4 km || 
|-id=281 bgcolor=#E9E9E9
| 122281 ||  || — || August 8, 2000 || Socorro || LINEAR || — || align=right | 3.5 km || 
|-id=282 bgcolor=#fefefe
| 122282 ||  || — || August 1, 2000 || Socorro || LINEAR || NYS || align=right | 1.3 km || 
|-id=283 bgcolor=#E9E9E9
| 122283 ||  || — || August 1, 2000 || Socorro || LINEAR || — || align=right | 3.4 km || 
|-id=284 bgcolor=#E9E9E9
| 122284 ||  || — || August 1, 2000 || Socorro || LINEAR || — || align=right | 2.3 km || 
|-id=285 bgcolor=#E9E9E9
| 122285 ||  || — || August 1, 2000 || Socorro || LINEAR || — || align=right | 2.3 km || 
|-id=286 bgcolor=#fefefe
| 122286 ||  || — || August 1, 2000 || Socorro || LINEAR || NYS || align=right | 2.9 km || 
|-id=287 bgcolor=#fefefe
| 122287 ||  || — || August 1, 2000 || Socorro || LINEAR || — || align=right | 1.6 km || 
|-id=288 bgcolor=#E9E9E9
| 122288 ||  || — || August 1, 2000 || Socorro || LINEAR || — || align=right | 1.8 km || 
|-id=289 bgcolor=#fefefe
| 122289 ||  || — || August 1, 2000 || Socorro || LINEAR || NYS || align=right | 1.5 km || 
|-id=290 bgcolor=#E9E9E9
| 122290 ||  || — || August 1, 2000 || Socorro || LINEAR || — || align=right | 2.7 km || 
|-id=291 bgcolor=#fefefe
| 122291 ||  || — || August 1, 2000 || Socorro || LINEAR || — || align=right | 1.9 km || 
|-id=292 bgcolor=#E9E9E9
| 122292 ||  || — || August 1, 2000 || Socorro || LINEAR || EUN || align=right | 2.3 km || 
|-id=293 bgcolor=#E9E9E9
| 122293 ||  || — || August 1, 2000 || Socorro || LINEAR || MAR || align=right | 3.1 km || 
|-id=294 bgcolor=#E9E9E9
| 122294 ||  || — || August 1, 2000 || Socorro || LINEAR || ADE || align=right | 4.3 km || 
|-id=295 bgcolor=#fefefe
| 122295 ||  || — || August 1, 2000 || Socorro || LINEAR || — || align=right | 1.6 km || 
|-id=296 bgcolor=#E9E9E9
| 122296 ||  || — || August 1, 2000 || Socorro || LINEAR || EUN || align=right | 2.8 km || 
|-id=297 bgcolor=#fefefe
| 122297 ||  || — || August 2, 2000 || Socorro || LINEAR || FLO || align=right | 1.9 km || 
|-id=298 bgcolor=#E9E9E9
| 122298 ||  || — || August 4, 2000 || Socorro || LINEAR || — || align=right | 3.0 km || 
|-id=299 bgcolor=#E9E9E9
| 122299 ||  || — || August 4, 2000 || Socorro || LINEAR || — || align=right | 3.6 km || 
|-id=300 bgcolor=#E9E9E9
| 122300 ||  || — || August 24, 2000 || Socorro || LINEAR || — || align=right | 2.0 km || 
|}

122301–122400 

|-bgcolor=#E9E9E9
| 122301 ||  || — || August 24, 2000 || Socorro || LINEAR || — || align=right | 1.9 km || 
|-id=302 bgcolor=#E9E9E9
| 122302 ||  || — || August 24, 2000 || Socorro || LINEAR || XIZ || align=right | 3.6 km || 
|-id=303 bgcolor=#E9E9E9
| 122303 ||  || — || August 24, 2000 || Socorro || LINEAR || — || align=right | 2.5 km || 
|-id=304 bgcolor=#fefefe
| 122304 ||  || — || August 24, 2000 || Socorro || LINEAR || V || align=right | 1.5 km || 
|-id=305 bgcolor=#fefefe
| 122305 ||  || — || August 24, 2000 || Socorro || LINEAR || V || align=right | 1.7 km || 
|-id=306 bgcolor=#fefefe
| 122306 ||  || — || August 24, 2000 || Farra d'Isonzo || Farra d'Isonzo || V || align=right | 1.6 km || 
|-id=307 bgcolor=#E9E9E9
| 122307 ||  || — || August 25, 2000 || Višnjan Observatory || K. Korlević, M. Jurić || — || align=right | 4.0 km || 
|-id=308 bgcolor=#fefefe
| 122308 ||  || — || August 25, 2000 || Višnjan Observatory || K. Korlević, M. Jurić || — || align=right | 1.9 km || 
|-id=309 bgcolor=#fefefe
| 122309 ||  || — || August 24, 2000 || Črni Vrh || Črni Vrh || V || align=right | 1.4 km || 
|-id=310 bgcolor=#d6d6d6
| 122310 ||  || — || August 21, 2000 || Saltsjöbaden || A. Brandeker || — || align=right | 5.3 km || 
|-id=311 bgcolor=#E9E9E9
| 122311 ||  || — || August 25, 2000 || Ondřejov || P. Kušnirák, P. Pravec || — || align=right | 3.6 km || 
|-id=312 bgcolor=#E9E9E9
| 122312 ||  || — || August 24, 2000 || Bergisch Gladbach || W. Bickel || — || align=right | 3.5 km || 
|-id=313 bgcolor=#fefefe
| 122313 ||  || — || August 24, 2000 || Socorro || LINEAR || — || align=right | 1.4 km || 
|-id=314 bgcolor=#fefefe
| 122314 ||  || — || August 24, 2000 || Socorro || LINEAR || NYS || align=right | 1.6 km || 
|-id=315 bgcolor=#fefefe
| 122315 ||  || — || August 24, 2000 || Socorro || LINEAR || NYS || align=right | 1.3 km || 
|-id=316 bgcolor=#fefefe
| 122316 ||  || — || August 24, 2000 || Socorro || LINEAR || — || align=right | 1.6 km || 
|-id=317 bgcolor=#fefefe
| 122317 ||  || — || August 24, 2000 || Socorro || LINEAR || NYS || align=right | 1.2 km || 
|-id=318 bgcolor=#E9E9E9
| 122318 ||  || — || August 24, 2000 || Socorro || LINEAR || — || align=right | 5.3 km || 
|-id=319 bgcolor=#E9E9E9
| 122319 ||  || — || August 24, 2000 || Socorro || LINEAR || HNS || align=right | 3.9 km || 
|-id=320 bgcolor=#E9E9E9
| 122320 ||  || — || August 24, 2000 || Socorro || LINEAR || — || align=right | 2.6 km || 
|-id=321 bgcolor=#fefefe
| 122321 ||  || — || August 24, 2000 || Socorro || LINEAR || MAS || align=right | 1.1 km || 
|-id=322 bgcolor=#E9E9E9
| 122322 ||  || — || August 24, 2000 || Socorro || LINEAR || — || align=right | 1.2 km || 
|-id=323 bgcolor=#E9E9E9
| 122323 ||  || — || August 24, 2000 || Socorro || LINEAR || — || align=right | 1.5 km || 
|-id=324 bgcolor=#E9E9E9
| 122324 ||  || — || August 24, 2000 || Socorro || LINEAR || — || align=right | 3.1 km || 
|-id=325 bgcolor=#E9E9E9
| 122325 ||  || — || August 24, 2000 || Socorro || LINEAR || — || align=right | 3.2 km || 
|-id=326 bgcolor=#fefefe
| 122326 ||  || — || August 24, 2000 || Socorro || LINEAR || NYS || align=right | 2.5 km || 
|-id=327 bgcolor=#fefefe
| 122327 ||  || — || August 24, 2000 || Socorro || LINEAR || NYS || align=right | 1.6 km || 
|-id=328 bgcolor=#E9E9E9
| 122328 ||  || — || August 24, 2000 || Socorro || LINEAR || — || align=right | 4.6 km || 
|-id=329 bgcolor=#fefefe
| 122329 ||  || — || August 25, 2000 || Socorro || LINEAR || — || align=right | 1.7 km || 
|-id=330 bgcolor=#E9E9E9
| 122330 ||  || — || August 25, 2000 || Socorro || LINEAR || — || align=right | 1.8 km || 
|-id=331 bgcolor=#E9E9E9
| 122331 ||  || — || August 25, 2000 || Socorro || LINEAR || — || align=right | 3.0 km || 
|-id=332 bgcolor=#E9E9E9
| 122332 ||  || — || August 24, 2000 || Socorro || LINEAR || — || align=right | 2.4 km || 
|-id=333 bgcolor=#fefefe
| 122333 ||  || — || August 24, 2000 || Socorro || LINEAR || NYS || align=right | 1.1 km || 
|-id=334 bgcolor=#fefefe
| 122334 ||  || — || August 24, 2000 || Socorro || LINEAR || NYS || align=right | 1.0 km || 
|-id=335 bgcolor=#E9E9E9
| 122335 ||  || — || August 24, 2000 || Socorro || LINEAR || — || align=right | 5.0 km || 
|-id=336 bgcolor=#E9E9E9
| 122336 ||  || — || August 26, 2000 || Socorro || LINEAR || — || align=right | 8.7 km || 
|-id=337 bgcolor=#fefefe
| 122337 ||  || — || August 27, 2000 || Ondřejov || P. Pravec, P. Kušnirák || — || align=right | 1.3 km || 
|-id=338 bgcolor=#fefefe
| 122338 ||  || — || August 24, 2000 || Socorro || LINEAR || — || align=right | 1.8 km || 
|-id=339 bgcolor=#E9E9E9
| 122339 ||  || — || August 24, 2000 || Socorro || LINEAR || — || align=right | 2.5 km || 
|-id=340 bgcolor=#d6d6d6
| 122340 ||  || — || August 24, 2000 || Socorro || LINEAR || HYG || align=right | 5.4 km || 
|-id=341 bgcolor=#fefefe
| 122341 ||  || — || August 24, 2000 || Socorro || LINEAR || — || align=right | 1.4 km || 
|-id=342 bgcolor=#fefefe
| 122342 ||  || — || August 24, 2000 || Socorro || LINEAR || — || align=right | 1.4 km || 
|-id=343 bgcolor=#fefefe
| 122343 ||  || — || August 24, 2000 || Socorro || LINEAR || V || align=right | 1.9 km || 
|-id=344 bgcolor=#E9E9E9
| 122344 ||  || — || August 24, 2000 || Socorro || LINEAR || — || align=right | 3.1 km || 
|-id=345 bgcolor=#fefefe
| 122345 ||  || — || August 24, 2000 || Socorro || LINEAR || NYS || align=right | 1.5 km || 
|-id=346 bgcolor=#E9E9E9
| 122346 ||  || — || August 24, 2000 || Socorro || LINEAR || — || align=right | 2.7 km || 
|-id=347 bgcolor=#fefefe
| 122347 ||  || — || August 24, 2000 || Socorro || LINEAR || NYS || align=right | 1.0 km || 
|-id=348 bgcolor=#E9E9E9
| 122348 ||  || — || August 24, 2000 || Socorro || LINEAR || RAF || align=right | 1.9 km || 
|-id=349 bgcolor=#E9E9E9
| 122349 ||  || — || August 24, 2000 || Socorro || LINEAR || — || align=right | 2.6 km || 
|-id=350 bgcolor=#E9E9E9
| 122350 ||  || — || August 24, 2000 || Socorro || LINEAR || — || align=right | 2.4 km || 
|-id=351 bgcolor=#fefefe
| 122351 ||  || — || August 24, 2000 || Socorro || LINEAR || V || align=right | 1.9 km || 
|-id=352 bgcolor=#fefefe
| 122352 ||  || — || August 24, 2000 || Socorro || LINEAR || — || align=right | 1.2 km || 
|-id=353 bgcolor=#E9E9E9
| 122353 ||  || — || August 24, 2000 || Socorro || LINEAR || EUN || align=right | 1.9 km || 
|-id=354 bgcolor=#fefefe
| 122354 ||  || — || August 24, 2000 || Socorro || LINEAR || — || align=right | 1.7 km || 
|-id=355 bgcolor=#fefefe
| 122355 ||  || — || August 24, 2000 || Socorro || LINEAR || NYS || align=right | 1.4 km || 
|-id=356 bgcolor=#E9E9E9
| 122356 ||  || — || August 24, 2000 || Socorro || LINEAR || — || align=right | 3.9 km || 
|-id=357 bgcolor=#fefefe
| 122357 ||  || — || August 24, 2000 || Socorro || LINEAR || MAS || align=right | 1.5 km || 
|-id=358 bgcolor=#FA8072
| 122358 ||  || — || August 24, 2000 || Socorro || LINEAR || — || align=right | 1.3 km || 
|-id=359 bgcolor=#E9E9E9
| 122359 ||  || — || August 24, 2000 || Socorro || LINEAR || — || align=right | 3.0 km || 
|-id=360 bgcolor=#fefefe
| 122360 ||  || — || August 24, 2000 || Socorro || LINEAR || — || align=right | 1.5 km || 
|-id=361 bgcolor=#E9E9E9
| 122361 ||  || — || August 24, 2000 || Socorro || LINEAR || — || align=right | 4.0 km || 
|-id=362 bgcolor=#fefefe
| 122362 ||  || — || August 24, 2000 || Socorro || LINEAR || NYS || align=right data-sort-value="0.90" | 900 m || 
|-id=363 bgcolor=#E9E9E9
| 122363 ||  || — || August 24, 2000 || Socorro || LINEAR || — || align=right | 2.2 km || 
|-id=364 bgcolor=#fefefe
| 122364 ||  || — || August 25, 2000 || Socorro || LINEAR || NYS || align=right | 3.4 km || 
|-id=365 bgcolor=#fefefe
| 122365 ||  || — || August 25, 2000 || Socorro || LINEAR || NYS || align=right | 1.2 km || 
|-id=366 bgcolor=#d6d6d6
| 122366 ||  || — || August 26, 2000 || Socorro || LINEAR || KOR || align=right | 2.8 km || 
|-id=367 bgcolor=#E9E9E9
| 122367 ||  || — || August 26, 2000 || Socorro || LINEAR || — || align=right | 3.1 km || 
|-id=368 bgcolor=#fefefe
| 122368 ||  || — || August 26, 2000 || Socorro || LINEAR || V || align=right | 1.9 km || 
|-id=369 bgcolor=#fefefe
| 122369 ||  || — || August 26, 2000 || Socorro || LINEAR || — || align=right | 3.1 km || 
|-id=370 bgcolor=#fefefe
| 122370 ||  || — || August 26, 2000 || Socorro || LINEAR || NYS || align=right data-sort-value="0.92" | 920 m || 
|-id=371 bgcolor=#E9E9E9
| 122371 ||  || — || August 26, 2000 || Socorro || LINEAR || — || align=right | 2.3 km || 
|-id=372 bgcolor=#fefefe
| 122372 ||  || — || August 26, 2000 || Socorro || LINEAR || — || align=right | 1.9 km || 
|-id=373 bgcolor=#fefefe
| 122373 ||  || — || August 28, 2000 || Socorro || LINEAR || — || align=right | 1.7 km || 
|-id=374 bgcolor=#fefefe
| 122374 ||  || — || August 28, 2000 || Socorro || LINEAR || V || align=right | 1.6 km || 
|-id=375 bgcolor=#fefefe
| 122375 ||  || — || August 28, 2000 || Socorro || LINEAR || FLO || align=right | 1.6 km || 
|-id=376 bgcolor=#E9E9E9
| 122376 ||  || — || August 28, 2000 || Socorro || LINEAR || — || align=right | 4.2 km || 
|-id=377 bgcolor=#E9E9E9
| 122377 ||  || — || August 28, 2000 || Socorro || LINEAR || — || align=right | 2.6 km || 
|-id=378 bgcolor=#E9E9E9
| 122378 ||  || — || August 28, 2000 || Socorro || LINEAR || — || align=right | 4.8 km || 
|-id=379 bgcolor=#fefefe
| 122379 ||  || — || August 28, 2000 || Socorro || LINEAR || — || align=right | 8.2 km || 
|-id=380 bgcolor=#E9E9E9
| 122380 ||  || — || August 24, 2000 || Socorro || LINEAR || — || align=right | 3.9 km || 
|-id=381 bgcolor=#E9E9E9
| 122381 ||  || — || August 28, 2000 || Socorro || LINEAR || — || align=right | 1.5 km || 
|-id=382 bgcolor=#E9E9E9
| 122382 ||  || — || August 29, 2000 || Socorro || LINEAR || BAR || align=right | 2.8 km || 
|-id=383 bgcolor=#E9E9E9
| 122383 ||  || — || August 26, 2000 || Prescott || P. G. Comba || — || align=right | 3.5 km || 
|-id=384 bgcolor=#E9E9E9
| 122384 ||  || — || August 24, 2000 || Socorro || LINEAR || RAF || align=right | 2.0 km || 
|-id=385 bgcolor=#fefefe
| 122385 ||  || — || August 24, 2000 || Socorro || LINEAR || NYS || align=right | 2.6 km || 
|-id=386 bgcolor=#E9E9E9
| 122386 ||  || — || August 24, 2000 || Socorro || LINEAR || — || align=right | 2.5 km || 
|-id=387 bgcolor=#E9E9E9
| 122387 ||  || — || August 24, 2000 || Socorro || LINEAR || — || align=right | 4.1 km || 
|-id=388 bgcolor=#fefefe
| 122388 ||  || — || August 24, 2000 || Socorro || LINEAR || NYS || align=right | 1.0 km || 
|-id=389 bgcolor=#fefefe
| 122389 ||  || — || August 24, 2000 || Socorro || LINEAR || NYS || align=right | 1.2 km || 
|-id=390 bgcolor=#E9E9E9
| 122390 ||  || — || August 24, 2000 || Socorro || LINEAR || — || align=right | 3.1 km || 
|-id=391 bgcolor=#C2FFFF
| 122391 ||  || — || August 24, 2000 || Socorro || LINEAR || L5 || align=right | 17 km || 
|-id=392 bgcolor=#fefefe
| 122392 ||  || — || August 24, 2000 || Socorro || LINEAR || V || align=right | 1.5 km || 
|-id=393 bgcolor=#E9E9E9
| 122393 ||  || — || August 24, 2000 || Socorro || LINEAR || — || align=right | 4.6 km || 
|-id=394 bgcolor=#fefefe
| 122394 ||  || — || August 24, 2000 || Socorro || LINEAR || NYS || align=right data-sort-value="0.98" | 980 m || 
|-id=395 bgcolor=#E9E9E9
| 122395 ||  || — || August 24, 2000 || Socorro || LINEAR || — || align=right | 2.0 km || 
|-id=396 bgcolor=#E9E9E9
| 122396 ||  || — || August 24, 2000 || Socorro || LINEAR || — || align=right | 3.5 km || 
|-id=397 bgcolor=#E9E9E9
| 122397 ||  || — || August 24, 2000 || Socorro || LINEAR || — || align=right | 2.4 km || 
|-id=398 bgcolor=#E9E9E9
| 122398 ||  || — || August 24, 2000 || Socorro || LINEAR || VIB || align=right | 4.3 km || 
|-id=399 bgcolor=#E9E9E9
| 122399 ||  || — || August 24, 2000 || Socorro || LINEAR || — || align=right | 1.7 km || 
|-id=400 bgcolor=#E9E9E9
| 122400 ||  || — || August 24, 2000 || Socorro || LINEAR || — || align=right | 4.7 km || 
|}

122401–122500 

|-bgcolor=#fefefe
| 122401 ||  || — || August 24, 2000 || Socorro || LINEAR || — || align=right | 1.5 km || 
|-id=402 bgcolor=#E9E9E9
| 122402 ||  || — || August 24, 2000 || Socorro || LINEAR || — || align=right | 3.7 km || 
|-id=403 bgcolor=#fefefe
| 122403 ||  || — || August 24, 2000 || Socorro || LINEAR || V || align=right | 1.6 km || 
|-id=404 bgcolor=#fefefe
| 122404 ||  || — || August 25, 2000 || Socorro || LINEAR || V || align=right | 1.4 km || 
|-id=405 bgcolor=#fefefe
| 122405 ||  || — || August 25, 2000 || Socorro || LINEAR || V || align=right | 1.4 km || 
|-id=406 bgcolor=#fefefe
| 122406 ||  || — || August 25, 2000 || Socorro || LINEAR || — || align=right | 2.2 km || 
|-id=407 bgcolor=#fefefe
| 122407 ||  || — || August 25, 2000 || Socorro || LINEAR || NYS || align=right | 4.3 km || 
|-id=408 bgcolor=#E9E9E9
| 122408 ||  || — || August 25, 2000 || Socorro || LINEAR || — || align=right | 2.5 km || 
|-id=409 bgcolor=#fefefe
| 122409 ||  || — || August 25, 2000 || Socorro || LINEAR || — || align=right | 3.9 km || 
|-id=410 bgcolor=#E9E9E9
| 122410 ||  || — || August 25, 2000 || Socorro || LINEAR || — || align=right | 3.5 km || 
|-id=411 bgcolor=#fefefe
| 122411 ||  || — || August 25, 2000 || Socorro || LINEAR || — || align=right | 1.8 km || 
|-id=412 bgcolor=#E9E9E9
| 122412 ||  || — || August 25, 2000 || Socorro || LINEAR || EUN || align=right | 2.0 km || 
|-id=413 bgcolor=#E9E9E9
| 122413 ||  || — || August 25, 2000 || Socorro || LINEAR || — || align=right | 2.2 km || 
|-id=414 bgcolor=#E9E9E9
| 122414 ||  || — || August 26, 2000 || Socorro || LINEAR || — || align=right | 1.9 km || 
|-id=415 bgcolor=#E9E9E9
| 122415 ||  || — || August 26, 2000 || Socorro || LINEAR || — || align=right | 1.8 km || 
|-id=416 bgcolor=#fefefe
| 122416 ||  || — || August 26, 2000 || Socorro || LINEAR || NYS || align=right | 1.2 km || 
|-id=417 bgcolor=#fefefe
| 122417 ||  || — || August 28, 2000 || Socorro || LINEAR || NYS || align=right | 1.3 km || 
|-id=418 bgcolor=#E9E9E9
| 122418 ||  || — || August 28, 2000 || Socorro || LINEAR || — || align=right | 1.7 km || 
|-id=419 bgcolor=#E9E9E9
| 122419 ||  || — || August 28, 2000 || Socorro || LINEAR || — || align=right | 5.2 km || 
|-id=420 bgcolor=#E9E9E9
| 122420 ||  || — || August 28, 2000 || Socorro || LINEAR || — || align=right | 2.1 km || 
|-id=421 bgcolor=#FA8072
| 122421 ||  || — || August 28, 2000 || Socorro || LINEAR || — || align=right | 2.0 km || 
|-id=422 bgcolor=#fefefe
| 122422 ||  || — || August 28, 2000 || Socorro || LINEAR || NYS || align=right | 3.0 km || 
|-id=423 bgcolor=#E9E9E9
| 122423 ||  || — || August 28, 2000 || Socorro || LINEAR || — || align=right | 2.4 km || 
|-id=424 bgcolor=#E9E9E9
| 122424 ||  || — || August 28, 2000 || Socorro || LINEAR || BAR || align=right | 2.3 km || 
|-id=425 bgcolor=#fefefe
| 122425 ||  || — || August 29, 2000 || Socorro || LINEAR || CLA || align=right | 3.2 km || 
|-id=426 bgcolor=#fefefe
| 122426 ||  || — || August 29, 2000 || Socorro || LINEAR || FLO || align=right | 1.5 km || 
|-id=427 bgcolor=#E9E9E9
| 122427 ||  || — || August 29, 2000 || Socorro || LINEAR || — || align=right | 5.2 km || 
|-id=428 bgcolor=#E9E9E9
| 122428 ||  || — || August 29, 2000 || Socorro || LINEAR || — || align=right | 4.0 km || 
|-id=429 bgcolor=#E9E9E9
| 122429 ||  || — || August 29, 2000 || Socorro || LINEAR || — || align=right | 1.7 km || 
|-id=430 bgcolor=#fefefe
| 122430 ||  || — || August 24, 2000 || Socorro || LINEAR || V || align=right | 1.6 km || 
|-id=431 bgcolor=#E9E9E9
| 122431 ||  || — || August 24, 2000 || Socorro || LINEAR || GEF || align=right | 2.3 km || 
|-id=432 bgcolor=#fefefe
| 122432 ||  || — || August 24, 2000 || Socorro || LINEAR || NYS || align=right | 1.3 km || 
|-id=433 bgcolor=#fefefe
| 122433 ||  || — || August 24, 2000 || Socorro || LINEAR || SUL || align=right | 3.6 km || 
|-id=434 bgcolor=#E9E9E9
| 122434 ||  || — || August 25, 2000 || Socorro || LINEAR || — || align=right | 3.7 km || 
|-id=435 bgcolor=#E9E9E9
| 122435 ||  || — || August 25, 2000 || Socorro || LINEAR || — || align=right | 3.2 km || 
|-id=436 bgcolor=#E9E9E9
| 122436 ||  || — || August 25, 2000 || Socorro || LINEAR || — || align=right | 1.8 km || 
|-id=437 bgcolor=#E9E9E9
| 122437 ||  || — || August 25, 2000 || Socorro || LINEAR || — || align=right | 2.3 km || 
|-id=438 bgcolor=#fefefe
| 122438 ||  || — || August 25, 2000 || Socorro || LINEAR || FLO || align=right | 1.3 km || 
|-id=439 bgcolor=#E9E9E9
| 122439 ||  || — || August 25, 2000 || Socorro || LINEAR || — || align=right | 2.0 km || 
|-id=440 bgcolor=#E9E9E9
| 122440 ||  || — || August 31, 2000 || Socorro || LINEAR || — || align=right | 1.1 km || 
|-id=441 bgcolor=#fefefe
| 122441 ||  || — || August 31, 2000 || Socorro || LINEAR || V || align=right | 2.5 km || 
|-id=442 bgcolor=#E9E9E9
| 122442 ||  || — || August 25, 2000 || Socorro || LINEAR || JUN || align=right | 1.9 km || 
|-id=443 bgcolor=#E9E9E9
| 122443 ||  || — || August 26, 2000 || Socorro || LINEAR || — || align=right | 1.8 km || 
|-id=444 bgcolor=#E9E9E9
| 122444 ||  || — || August 26, 2000 || Socorro || LINEAR || — || align=right | 1.8 km || 
|-id=445 bgcolor=#fefefe
| 122445 ||  || — || August 26, 2000 || Socorro || LINEAR || — || align=right | 3.4 km || 
|-id=446 bgcolor=#E9E9E9
| 122446 ||  || — || August 26, 2000 || Socorro || LINEAR || — || align=right | 2.4 km || 
|-id=447 bgcolor=#fefefe
| 122447 ||  || — || August 28, 2000 || Socorro || LINEAR || — || align=right | 2.2 km || 
|-id=448 bgcolor=#fefefe
| 122448 ||  || — || August 29, 2000 || Socorro || LINEAR || FLO || align=right | 1.9 km || 
|-id=449 bgcolor=#E9E9E9
| 122449 ||  || — || August 31, 2000 || Socorro || LINEAR || MAR || align=right | 1.9 km || 
|-id=450 bgcolor=#E9E9E9
| 122450 ||  || — || August 31, 2000 || Socorro || LINEAR || — || align=right | 4.6 km || 
|-id=451 bgcolor=#fefefe
| 122451 ||  || — || August 31, 2000 || Socorro || LINEAR || NYS || align=right | 1.2 km || 
|-id=452 bgcolor=#fefefe
| 122452 ||  || — || August 31, 2000 || Socorro || LINEAR || V || align=right | 1.9 km || 
|-id=453 bgcolor=#E9E9E9
| 122453 ||  || — || August 31, 2000 || Socorro || LINEAR || — || align=right | 3.7 km || 
|-id=454 bgcolor=#E9E9E9
| 122454 ||  || — || August 31, 2000 || Socorro || LINEAR || — || align=right | 3.0 km || 
|-id=455 bgcolor=#E9E9E9
| 122455 ||  || — || August 31, 2000 || Socorro || LINEAR || — || align=right | 3.3 km || 
|-id=456 bgcolor=#fefefe
| 122456 ||  || — || August 31, 2000 || Socorro || LINEAR || V || align=right | 1.4 km || 
|-id=457 bgcolor=#E9E9E9
| 122457 ||  || — || August 31, 2000 || Socorro || LINEAR || — || align=right | 2.7 km || 
|-id=458 bgcolor=#fefefe
| 122458 ||  || — || August 31, 2000 || Socorro || LINEAR || NYS || align=right | 1.3 km || 
|-id=459 bgcolor=#E9E9E9
| 122459 ||  || — || August 31, 2000 || Socorro || LINEAR || — || align=right | 1.6 km || 
|-id=460 bgcolor=#C2FFFF
| 122460 ||  || — || August 31, 2000 || Socorro || LINEAR || L5 || align=right | 21 km || 
|-id=461 bgcolor=#E9E9E9
| 122461 ||  || — || August 31, 2000 || Socorro || LINEAR || — || align=right | 2.4 km || 
|-id=462 bgcolor=#fefefe
| 122462 ||  || — || August 31, 2000 || Socorro || LINEAR || — || align=right | 2.1 km || 
|-id=463 bgcolor=#FA8072
| 122463 ||  || — || August 25, 2000 || Socorro || LINEAR || slow || align=right | 2.4 km || 
|-id=464 bgcolor=#fefefe
| 122464 ||  || — || August 24, 2000 || Socorro || LINEAR || — || align=right | 1.9 km || 
|-id=465 bgcolor=#E9E9E9
| 122465 ||  || — || August 25, 2000 || Socorro || LINEAR || — || align=right | 3.8 km || 
|-id=466 bgcolor=#E9E9E9
| 122466 ||  || — || August 25, 2000 || Socorro || LINEAR || EUN || align=right | 3.0 km || 
|-id=467 bgcolor=#E9E9E9
| 122467 ||  || — || August 25, 2000 || Socorro || LINEAR || — || align=right | 2.2 km || 
|-id=468 bgcolor=#E9E9E9
| 122468 ||  || — || August 31, 2000 || Socorro || LINEAR || — || align=right | 3.5 km || 
|-id=469 bgcolor=#E9E9E9
| 122469 ||  || — || August 31, 2000 || Socorro || LINEAR || — || align=right | 4.9 km || 
|-id=470 bgcolor=#E9E9E9
| 122470 ||  || — || August 31, 2000 || Socorro || LINEAR || JUN || align=right | 2.1 km || 
|-id=471 bgcolor=#E9E9E9
| 122471 ||  || — || August 31, 2000 || Socorro || LINEAR || EUN || align=right | 2.3 km || 
|-id=472 bgcolor=#E9E9E9
| 122472 ||  || — || August 31, 2000 || Socorro || LINEAR || — || align=right | 2.6 km || 
|-id=473 bgcolor=#E9E9E9
| 122473 ||  || — || August 31, 2000 || Socorro || LINEAR || — || align=right | 3.6 km || 
|-id=474 bgcolor=#fefefe
| 122474 ||  || — || August 31, 2000 || Socorro || LINEAR || — || align=right | 3.0 km || 
|-id=475 bgcolor=#E9E9E9
| 122475 ||  || — || August 31, 2000 || Socorro || LINEAR || — || align=right | 3.2 km || 
|-id=476 bgcolor=#fefefe
| 122476 ||  || — || August 31, 2000 || Socorro || LINEAR || FLO || align=right | 1.1 km || 
|-id=477 bgcolor=#E9E9E9
| 122477 ||  || — || August 31, 2000 || Socorro || LINEAR || NEM || align=right | 4.2 km || 
|-id=478 bgcolor=#E9E9E9
| 122478 ||  || — || August 31, 2000 || Socorro || LINEAR || — || align=right | 1.5 km || 
|-id=479 bgcolor=#fefefe
| 122479 ||  || — || August 31, 2000 || Socorro || LINEAR || V || align=right | 1.2 km || 
|-id=480 bgcolor=#fefefe
| 122480 ||  || — || August 31, 2000 || Socorro || LINEAR || V || align=right | 1.3 km || 
|-id=481 bgcolor=#fefefe
| 122481 ||  || — || August 31, 2000 || Socorro || LINEAR || V || align=right | 1.8 km || 
|-id=482 bgcolor=#fefefe
| 122482 ||  || — || August 31, 2000 || Socorro || LINEAR || — || align=right | 3.0 km || 
|-id=483 bgcolor=#E9E9E9
| 122483 ||  || — || August 31, 2000 || Socorro || LINEAR || — || align=right | 3.0 km || 
|-id=484 bgcolor=#fefefe
| 122484 ||  || — || August 31, 2000 || Socorro || LINEAR || — || align=right | 1.7 km || 
|-id=485 bgcolor=#fefefe
| 122485 ||  || — || August 31, 2000 || Socorro || LINEAR || FLO || align=right | 1.4 km || 
|-id=486 bgcolor=#fefefe
| 122486 ||  || — || August 31, 2000 || Socorro || LINEAR || V || align=right | 1.6 km || 
|-id=487 bgcolor=#fefefe
| 122487 ||  || — || August 31, 2000 || Socorro || LINEAR || FLO || align=right | 1.2 km || 
|-id=488 bgcolor=#fefefe
| 122488 ||  || — || August 31, 2000 || Socorro || LINEAR || — || align=right | 2.3 km || 
|-id=489 bgcolor=#E9E9E9
| 122489 ||  || — || August 31, 2000 || Socorro || LINEAR || — || align=right | 2.0 km || 
|-id=490 bgcolor=#E9E9E9
| 122490 ||  || — || August 31, 2000 || Socorro || LINEAR || — || align=right | 1.9 km || 
|-id=491 bgcolor=#E9E9E9
| 122491 ||  || — || August 31, 2000 || Socorro || LINEAR || — || align=right | 3.0 km || 
|-id=492 bgcolor=#fefefe
| 122492 ||  || — || August 31, 2000 || Socorro || LINEAR || V || align=right | 1.2 km || 
|-id=493 bgcolor=#E9E9E9
| 122493 ||  || — || August 31, 2000 || Socorro || LINEAR || HNS || align=right | 2.5 km || 
|-id=494 bgcolor=#E9E9E9
| 122494 ||  || — || August 31, 2000 || Socorro || LINEAR || GEF || align=right | 3.2 km || 
|-id=495 bgcolor=#E9E9E9
| 122495 ||  || — || August 31, 2000 || Socorro || LINEAR || — || align=right | 7.3 km || 
|-id=496 bgcolor=#E9E9E9
| 122496 ||  || — || August 26, 2000 || Socorro || LINEAR || — || align=right | 3.9 km || 
|-id=497 bgcolor=#E9E9E9
| 122497 ||  || — || August 26, 2000 || Socorro || LINEAR || — || align=right | 3.0 km || 
|-id=498 bgcolor=#fefefe
| 122498 ||  || — || August 26, 2000 || Socorro || LINEAR || — || align=right | 1.6 km || 
|-id=499 bgcolor=#E9E9E9
| 122499 ||  || — || August 26, 2000 || Socorro || LINEAR || MAR || align=right | 1.7 km || 
|-id=500 bgcolor=#E9E9E9
| 122500 ||  || — || August 29, 2000 || Socorro || LINEAR || EUN || align=right | 2.6 km || 
|}

122501–122600 

|-bgcolor=#E9E9E9
| 122501 ||  || — || August 31, 2000 || Socorro || LINEAR || — || align=right | 4.0 km || 
|-id=502 bgcolor=#fefefe
| 122502 ||  || — || August 26, 2000 || Socorro || LINEAR || V || align=right | 1.2 km || 
|-id=503 bgcolor=#fefefe
| 122503 ||  || — || August 29, 2000 || Socorro || LINEAR || — || align=right | 1.2 km || 
|-id=504 bgcolor=#fefefe
| 122504 ||  || — || August 29, 2000 || Socorro || LINEAR || FLO || align=right | 1.2 km || 
|-id=505 bgcolor=#fefefe
| 122505 ||  || — || August 29, 2000 || Socorro || LINEAR || — || align=right | 1.3 km || 
|-id=506 bgcolor=#fefefe
| 122506 ||  || — || August 29, 2000 || Socorro || LINEAR || — || align=right | 3.1 km || 
|-id=507 bgcolor=#fefefe
| 122507 ||  || — || August 29, 2000 || Socorro || LINEAR || MAS || align=right | 1.1 km || 
|-id=508 bgcolor=#fefefe
| 122508 ||  || — || August 29, 2000 || Socorro || LINEAR || V || align=right | 1.2 km || 
|-id=509 bgcolor=#E9E9E9
| 122509 ||  || — || August 29, 2000 || Socorro || LINEAR || — || align=right | 2.2 km || 
|-id=510 bgcolor=#fefefe
| 122510 ||  || — || August 29, 2000 || Socorro || LINEAR || — || align=right | 1.4 km || 
|-id=511 bgcolor=#E9E9E9
| 122511 ||  || — || August 29, 2000 || Socorro || LINEAR || — || align=right | 1.5 km || 
|-id=512 bgcolor=#fefefe
| 122512 ||  || — || August 29, 2000 || Socorro || LINEAR || NYS || align=right | 1.2 km || 
|-id=513 bgcolor=#fefefe
| 122513 ||  || — || August 29, 2000 || Socorro || LINEAR || NYS || align=right | 1.2 km || 
|-id=514 bgcolor=#fefefe
| 122514 ||  || — || August 29, 2000 || Socorro || LINEAR || NYS || align=right | 1.1 km || 
|-id=515 bgcolor=#fefefe
| 122515 ||  || — || August 29, 2000 || Socorro || LINEAR || — || align=right | 1.5 km || 
|-id=516 bgcolor=#fefefe
| 122516 ||  || — || August 31, 2000 || Socorro || LINEAR || MAS || align=right | 1.2 km || 
|-id=517 bgcolor=#E9E9E9
| 122517 ||  || — || August 31, 2000 || Socorro || LINEAR || — || align=right | 2.5 km || 
|-id=518 bgcolor=#E9E9E9
| 122518 ||  || — || August 31, 2000 || Socorro || LINEAR || — || align=right | 2.0 km || 
|-id=519 bgcolor=#fefefe
| 122519 ||  || — || August 31, 2000 || Socorro || LINEAR || — || align=right | 2.4 km || 
|-id=520 bgcolor=#E9E9E9
| 122520 ||  || — || August 31, 2000 || Socorro || LINEAR || MAR || align=right | 2.2 km || 
|-id=521 bgcolor=#E9E9E9
| 122521 ||  || — || August 31, 2000 || Socorro || LINEAR || — || align=right | 2.3 km || 
|-id=522 bgcolor=#E9E9E9
| 122522 ||  || — || August 31, 2000 || Socorro || LINEAR || — || align=right | 4.4 km || 
|-id=523 bgcolor=#E9E9E9
| 122523 ||  || — || August 31, 2000 || Socorro || LINEAR || — || align=right | 1.6 km || 
|-id=524 bgcolor=#fefefe
| 122524 ||  || — || August 31, 2000 || Socorro || LINEAR || — || align=right | 1.8 km || 
|-id=525 bgcolor=#E9E9E9
| 122525 ||  || — || August 31, 2000 || Socorro || LINEAR || — || align=right | 3.1 km || 
|-id=526 bgcolor=#fefefe
| 122526 ||  || — || August 31, 2000 || Socorro || LINEAR || NYS || align=right | 1.2 km || 
|-id=527 bgcolor=#fefefe
| 122527 ||  || — || August 31, 2000 || Socorro || LINEAR || — || align=right | 1.4 km || 
|-id=528 bgcolor=#E9E9E9
| 122528 ||  || — || August 31, 2000 || Socorro || LINEAR || MIS || align=right | 4.1 km || 
|-id=529 bgcolor=#fefefe
| 122529 ||  || — || August 31, 2000 || Socorro || LINEAR || NYS || align=right | 1.2 km || 
|-id=530 bgcolor=#E9E9E9
| 122530 ||  || — || August 31, 2000 || Socorro || LINEAR || — || align=right | 1.8 km || 
|-id=531 bgcolor=#fefefe
| 122531 ||  || — || August 31, 2000 || Socorro || LINEAR || — || align=right | 2.0 km || 
|-id=532 bgcolor=#E9E9E9
| 122532 ||  || — || August 31, 2000 || Socorro || LINEAR || — || align=right | 4.4 km || 
|-id=533 bgcolor=#E9E9E9
| 122533 ||  || — || August 31, 2000 || Socorro || LINEAR || — || align=right | 4.3 km || 
|-id=534 bgcolor=#fefefe
| 122534 ||  || — || August 31, 2000 || Socorro || LINEAR || MAS || align=right data-sort-value="0.97" | 970 m || 
|-id=535 bgcolor=#E9E9E9
| 122535 ||  || — || August 31, 2000 || Socorro || LINEAR || — || align=right | 2.1 km || 
|-id=536 bgcolor=#E9E9E9
| 122536 ||  || — || August 31, 2000 || Socorro || LINEAR || — || align=right | 2.0 km || 
|-id=537 bgcolor=#E9E9E9
| 122537 ||  || — || August 20, 2000 || Anderson Mesa || LONEOS || — || align=right | 1.9 km || 
|-id=538 bgcolor=#fefefe
| 122538 ||  || — || August 21, 2000 || Anderson Mesa || LONEOS || V || align=right | 1.1 km || 
|-id=539 bgcolor=#E9E9E9
| 122539 ||  || — || August 21, 2000 || Anderson Mesa || LONEOS || — || align=right | 2.1 km || 
|-id=540 bgcolor=#E9E9E9
| 122540 ||  || — || August 21, 2000 || Anderson Mesa || LONEOS || — || align=right | 2.5 km || 
|-id=541 bgcolor=#fefefe
| 122541 ||  || — || August 21, 2000 || Anderson Mesa || LONEOS || MAS || align=right | 1.5 km || 
|-id=542 bgcolor=#fefefe
| 122542 ||  || — || August 21, 2000 || Anderson Mesa || LONEOS || — || align=right | 3.8 km || 
|-id=543 bgcolor=#fefefe
| 122543 ||  || — || August 26, 2000 || Socorro || LINEAR || V || align=right | 1.1 km || 
|-id=544 bgcolor=#fefefe
| 122544 ||  || — || August 26, 2000 || Kitt Peak || Spacewatch || V || align=right | 1.5 km || 
|-id=545 bgcolor=#fefefe
| 122545 ||  || — || August 29, 2000 || Socorro || LINEAR || — || align=right | 1.8 km || 
|-id=546 bgcolor=#E9E9E9
| 122546 ||  || — || August 31, 2000 || Socorro || LINEAR || — || align=right | 7.7 km || 
|-id=547 bgcolor=#E9E9E9
| 122547 ||  || — || August 31, 2000 || Socorro || LINEAR || — || align=right | 2.2 km || 
|-id=548 bgcolor=#E9E9E9
| 122548 ||  || — || August 31, 2000 || Socorro || LINEAR || — || align=right | 1.8 km || 
|-id=549 bgcolor=#E9E9E9
| 122549 ||  || — || August 31, 2000 || Socorro || LINEAR || — || align=right | 1.6 km || 
|-id=550 bgcolor=#E9E9E9
| 122550 ||  || — || August 31, 2000 || Socorro || LINEAR || MAR || align=right | 2.4 km || 
|-id=551 bgcolor=#fefefe
| 122551 ||  || — || August 31, 2000 || Socorro || LINEAR || V || align=right | 1.3 km || 
|-id=552 bgcolor=#E9E9E9
| 122552 ||  || — || August 29, 2000 || Socorro || LINEAR || — || align=right | 1.4 km || 
|-id=553 bgcolor=#E9E9E9
| 122553 ||  || — || August 24, 2000 || Socorro || LINEAR || — || align=right | 1.7 km || 
|-id=554 bgcolor=#fefefe
| 122554 Joséhernández ||  ||  || August 25, 2000 || Cerro Tololo || M. W. Buie || MAS || align=right | 1.1 km || 
|-id=555 bgcolor=#fefefe
| 122555 Auñón-Chancellor ||  ||  || August 28, 2000 || Cerro Tololo || M. W. Buie || — || align=right | 1.4 km || 
|-id=556 bgcolor=#fefefe
| 122556 ||  || — || August 21, 2000 || Anderson Mesa || LONEOS || — || align=right | 3.2 km || 
|-id=557 bgcolor=#fefefe
| 122557 ||  || — || August 24, 2000 || Socorro || LINEAR || — || align=right | 2.0 km || 
|-id=558 bgcolor=#E9E9E9
| 122558 || 2000 RA || — || September 1, 2000 || Višnjan Observatory || K. Korlević || — || align=right | 4.7 km || 
|-id=559 bgcolor=#E9E9E9
| 122559 ||  || — || September 1, 2000 || Socorro || LINEAR || — || align=right | 2.0 km || 
|-id=560 bgcolor=#E9E9E9
| 122560 ||  || — || September 1, 2000 || Socorro || LINEAR || — || align=right | 2.5 km || 
|-id=561 bgcolor=#E9E9E9
| 122561 ||  || — || September 1, 2000 || Socorro || LINEAR || — || align=right | 2.7 km || 
|-id=562 bgcolor=#E9E9E9
| 122562 ||  || — || September 1, 2000 || Socorro || LINEAR || — || align=right | 2.6 km || 
|-id=563 bgcolor=#E9E9E9
| 122563 ||  || — || September 1, 2000 || Socorro || LINEAR || — || align=right | 5.4 km || 
|-id=564 bgcolor=#E9E9E9
| 122564 ||  || — || September 1, 2000 || Socorro || LINEAR || — || align=right | 2.3 km || 
|-id=565 bgcolor=#fefefe
| 122565 ||  || — || September 1, 2000 || Socorro || LINEAR || FLO || align=right | 1.4 km || 
|-id=566 bgcolor=#E9E9E9
| 122566 ||  || — || September 1, 2000 || Socorro || LINEAR || EUN || align=right | 1.9 km || 
|-id=567 bgcolor=#E9E9E9
| 122567 ||  || — || September 1, 2000 || Socorro || LINEAR || — || align=right | 2.4 km || 
|-id=568 bgcolor=#fefefe
| 122568 ||  || — || September 1, 2000 || Socorro || LINEAR || PHO || align=right | 2.2 km || 
|-id=569 bgcolor=#E9E9E9
| 122569 ||  || — || September 1, 2000 || Socorro || LINEAR || — || align=right | 2.8 km || 
|-id=570 bgcolor=#E9E9E9
| 122570 ||  || — || September 3, 2000 || Bisei SG Center || BATTeRS || JUN || align=right | 3.4 km || 
|-id=571 bgcolor=#E9E9E9
| 122571 ||  || — || September 1, 2000 || Socorro || LINEAR || — || align=right | 2.7 km || 
|-id=572 bgcolor=#E9E9E9
| 122572 ||  || — || September 1, 2000 || Socorro || LINEAR || MAR || align=right | 2.5 km || 
|-id=573 bgcolor=#E9E9E9
| 122573 ||  || — || September 1, 2000 || Socorro || LINEAR || HNS || align=right | 3.3 km || 
|-id=574 bgcolor=#fefefe
| 122574 ||  || — || September 1, 2000 || Socorro || LINEAR || V || align=right | 1.3 km || 
|-id=575 bgcolor=#E9E9E9
| 122575 ||  || — || September 1, 2000 || Socorro || LINEAR || — || align=right | 3.8 km || 
|-id=576 bgcolor=#fefefe
| 122576 ||  || — || September 1, 2000 || Socorro || LINEAR || — || align=right | 2.0 km || 
|-id=577 bgcolor=#E9E9E9
| 122577 ||  || — || September 1, 2000 || Socorro || LINEAR || — || align=right | 2.8 km || 
|-id=578 bgcolor=#fefefe
| 122578 ||  || — || September 1, 2000 || Socorro || LINEAR || — || align=right | 1.8 km || 
|-id=579 bgcolor=#E9E9E9
| 122579 ||  || — || September 1, 2000 || Socorro || LINEAR || — || align=right | 2.6 km || 
|-id=580 bgcolor=#fefefe
| 122580 ||  || — || September 1, 2000 || Socorro || LINEAR || — || align=right | 1.4 km || 
|-id=581 bgcolor=#C2FFFF
| 122581 ||  || — || September 1, 2000 || Socorro || LINEAR || L5 || align=right | 17 km || 
|-id=582 bgcolor=#E9E9E9
| 122582 ||  || — || September 1, 2000 || Socorro || LINEAR || — || align=right | 4.8 km || 
|-id=583 bgcolor=#fefefe
| 122583 ||  || — || September 1, 2000 || Socorro || LINEAR || — || align=right | 1.7 km || 
|-id=584 bgcolor=#E9E9E9
| 122584 ||  || — || September 1, 2000 || Socorro || LINEAR || — || align=right | 3.4 km || 
|-id=585 bgcolor=#E9E9E9
| 122585 ||  || — || September 1, 2000 || Socorro || LINEAR || — || align=right | 3.1 km || 
|-id=586 bgcolor=#fefefe
| 122586 ||  || — || September 1, 2000 || Socorro || LINEAR || — || align=right | 3.2 km || 
|-id=587 bgcolor=#fefefe
| 122587 ||  || — || September 1, 2000 || Socorro || LINEAR || — || align=right | 1.4 km || 
|-id=588 bgcolor=#E9E9E9
| 122588 ||  || — || September 1, 2000 || Socorro || LINEAR || EUN || align=right | 2.1 km || 
|-id=589 bgcolor=#E9E9E9
| 122589 ||  || — || September 1, 2000 || Socorro || LINEAR || — || align=right | 2.6 km || 
|-id=590 bgcolor=#E9E9E9
| 122590 ||  || — || September 1, 2000 || Socorro || LINEAR || — || align=right | 4.2 km || 
|-id=591 bgcolor=#E9E9E9
| 122591 ||  || — || September 1, 2000 || Socorro || LINEAR || — || align=right | 2.4 km || 
|-id=592 bgcolor=#C2FFFF
| 122592 ||  || — || September 1, 2000 || Socorro || LINEAR || L5 || align=right | 21 km || 
|-id=593 bgcolor=#E9E9E9
| 122593 ||  || — || September 1, 2000 || Socorro || LINEAR || — || align=right | 2.0 km || 
|-id=594 bgcolor=#fefefe
| 122594 ||  || — || September 1, 2000 || Socorro || LINEAR || — || align=right | 1.8 km || 
|-id=595 bgcolor=#fefefe
| 122595 ||  || — || September 1, 2000 || Socorro || LINEAR || NYS || align=right | 1.5 km || 
|-id=596 bgcolor=#fefefe
| 122596 ||  || — || September 1, 2000 || Socorro || LINEAR || CIM || align=right | 3.2 km || 
|-id=597 bgcolor=#E9E9E9
| 122597 ||  || — || September 2, 2000 || Socorro || LINEAR || — || align=right | 3.9 km || 
|-id=598 bgcolor=#E9E9E9
| 122598 ||  || — || September 3, 2000 || Socorro || LINEAR || MIT || align=right | 5.3 km || 
|-id=599 bgcolor=#E9E9E9
| 122599 ||  || — || September 3, 2000 || Socorro || LINEAR || JUN || align=right | 2.3 km || 
|-id=600 bgcolor=#fefefe
| 122600 ||  || — || September 5, 2000 || Kvistaberg || UDAS || NYS || align=right | 1.3 km || 
|}

122601–122700 

|-bgcolor=#E9E9E9
| 122601 ||  || — || September 1, 2000 || Socorro || LINEAR || MAR || align=right | 3.8 km || 
|-id=602 bgcolor=#E9E9E9
| 122602 ||  || — || September 3, 2000 || Socorro || LINEAR || — || align=right | 3.1 km || 
|-id=603 bgcolor=#E9E9E9
| 122603 ||  || — || September 3, 2000 || Socorro || LINEAR || — || align=right | 3.0 km || 
|-id=604 bgcolor=#E9E9E9
| 122604 ||  || — || September 3, 2000 || Socorro || LINEAR || DOR || align=right | 5.6 km || 
|-id=605 bgcolor=#fefefe
| 122605 ||  || — || September 3, 2000 || Socorro || LINEAR || — || align=right | 4.4 km || 
|-id=606 bgcolor=#E9E9E9
| 122606 ||  || — || September 3, 2000 || Socorro || LINEAR || — || align=right | 2.2 km || 
|-id=607 bgcolor=#E9E9E9
| 122607 ||  || — || September 3, 2000 || Socorro || LINEAR || — || align=right | 3.0 km || 
|-id=608 bgcolor=#E9E9E9
| 122608 ||  || — || September 3, 2000 || Socorro || LINEAR || — || align=right | 2.4 km || 
|-id=609 bgcolor=#E9E9E9
| 122609 ||  || — || September 3, 2000 || Socorro || LINEAR || — || align=right | 2.5 km || 
|-id=610 bgcolor=#E9E9E9
| 122610 ||  || — || September 3, 2000 || Socorro || LINEAR || — || align=right | 2.6 km || 
|-id=611 bgcolor=#E9E9E9
| 122611 ||  || — || September 3, 2000 || Socorro || LINEAR || — || align=right | 2.7 km || 
|-id=612 bgcolor=#E9E9E9
| 122612 ||  || — || September 3, 2000 || Socorro || LINEAR || — || align=right | 5.0 km || 
|-id=613 bgcolor=#E9E9E9
| 122613 ||  || — || September 3, 2000 || Socorro || LINEAR || JUN || align=right | 4.1 km || 
|-id=614 bgcolor=#E9E9E9
| 122614 ||  || — || September 5, 2000 || Socorro || LINEAR || EUN || align=right | 2.2 km || 
|-id=615 bgcolor=#E9E9E9
| 122615 ||  || — || September 5, 2000 || Socorro || LINEAR || — || align=right | 2.6 km || 
|-id=616 bgcolor=#E9E9E9
| 122616 ||  || — || September 5, 2000 || Socorro || LINEAR || — || align=right | 1.7 km || 
|-id=617 bgcolor=#E9E9E9
| 122617 ||  || — || September 3, 2000 || Socorro || LINEAR || KRM || align=right | 6.6 km || 
|-id=618 bgcolor=#E9E9E9
| 122618 ||  || — || September 4, 2000 || Socorro || LINEAR || GEF || align=right | 3.8 km || 
|-id=619 bgcolor=#E9E9E9
| 122619 ||  || — || September 7, 2000 || Kitt Peak || Spacewatch || — || align=right | 2.1 km || 
|-id=620 bgcolor=#E9E9E9
| 122620 ||  || — || September 1, 2000 || Socorro || LINEAR || — || align=right | 5.9 km || 
|-id=621 bgcolor=#fefefe
| 122621 ||  || — || September 2, 2000 || Socorro || LINEAR || — || align=right | 1.7 km || 
|-id=622 bgcolor=#E9E9E9
| 122622 ||  || — || September 1, 2000 || Socorro || LINEAR || EUN || align=right | 2.9 km || 
|-id=623 bgcolor=#fefefe
| 122623 ||  || — || September 1, 2000 || Socorro || LINEAR || NYS || align=right | 1.5 km || 
|-id=624 bgcolor=#fefefe
| 122624 ||  || — || September 2, 2000 || Socorro || LINEAR || MAS || align=right | 1.3 km || 
|-id=625 bgcolor=#fefefe
| 122625 ||  || — || September 2, 2000 || Socorro || LINEAR || — || align=right | 1.3 km || 
|-id=626 bgcolor=#fefefe
| 122626 ||  || — || September 2, 2000 || Socorro || LINEAR || PHO || align=right | 2.2 km || 
|-id=627 bgcolor=#E9E9E9
| 122627 ||  || — || September 2, 2000 || Socorro || LINEAR || — || align=right | 3.0 km || 
|-id=628 bgcolor=#fefefe
| 122628 ||  || — || September 2, 2000 || Socorro || LINEAR || — || align=right | 1.6 km || 
|-id=629 bgcolor=#E9E9E9
| 122629 ||  || — || September 8, 2000 || Socorro || LINEAR || — || align=right | 6.3 km || 
|-id=630 bgcolor=#fefefe
| 122630 ||  || — || September 8, 2000 || Kitt Peak || Spacewatch || — || align=right | 1.6 km || 
|-id=631 bgcolor=#E9E9E9
| 122631 ||  || — || September 10, 2000 || Višnjan Observatory || K. Korlević || — || align=right | 3.6 km || 
|-id=632 bgcolor=#E9E9E9
| 122632 Riccioli ||  ||  || September 5, 2000 || Monte Agliale || S. Donati || — || align=right | 2.2 km || 
|-id=633 bgcolor=#E9E9E9
| 122633 ||  || — || September 1, 2000 || Socorro || LINEAR || IAN || align=right | 2.0 km || 
|-id=634 bgcolor=#fefefe
| 122634 ||  || — || September 1, 2000 || Socorro || LINEAR || — || align=right | 1.5 km || 
|-id=635 bgcolor=#E9E9E9
| 122635 ||  || — || September 1, 2000 || Socorro || LINEAR || EUN || align=right | 2.6 km || 
|-id=636 bgcolor=#E9E9E9
| 122636 ||  || — || September 1, 2000 || Socorro || LINEAR || IAN || align=right | 2.0 km || 
|-id=637 bgcolor=#E9E9E9
| 122637 ||  || — || September 1, 2000 || Socorro || LINEAR || — || align=right | 3.1 km || 
|-id=638 bgcolor=#E9E9E9
| 122638 ||  || — || September 1, 2000 || Socorro || LINEAR || EUN || align=right | 2.6 km || 
|-id=639 bgcolor=#E9E9E9
| 122639 ||  || — || September 1, 2000 || Socorro || LINEAR || — || align=right | 2.8 km || 
|-id=640 bgcolor=#E9E9E9
| 122640 ||  || — || September 1, 2000 || Socorro || LINEAR || ADE || align=right | 3.0 km || 
|-id=641 bgcolor=#E9E9E9
| 122641 ||  || — || September 2, 2000 || Anderson Mesa || LONEOS || — || align=right | 2.1 km || 
|-id=642 bgcolor=#E9E9E9
| 122642 ||  || — || September 2, 2000 || Anderson Mesa || LONEOS || — || align=right | 1.7 km || 
|-id=643 bgcolor=#fefefe
| 122643 ||  || — || September 2, 2000 || Anderson Mesa || LONEOS || V || align=right | 1.3 km || 
|-id=644 bgcolor=#fefefe
| 122644 ||  || — || September 2, 2000 || Anderson Mesa || LONEOS || NYS || align=right | 1.3 km || 
|-id=645 bgcolor=#fefefe
| 122645 ||  || — || September 2, 2000 || Socorro || LINEAR || NYS || align=right | 1.0 km || 
|-id=646 bgcolor=#E9E9E9
| 122646 ||  || — || September 2, 2000 || Anderson Mesa || LONEOS || EUN || align=right | 2.2 km || 
|-id=647 bgcolor=#fefefe
| 122647 ||  || — || September 2, 2000 || Anderson Mesa || LONEOS || — || align=right | 1.6 km || 
|-id=648 bgcolor=#fefefe
| 122648 ||  || — || September 2, 2000 || Anderson Mesa || LONEOS || NYS || align=right | 1.2 km || 
|-id=649 bgcolor=#E9E9E9
| 122649 ||  || — || September 2, 2000 || Anderson Mesa || LONEOS || NEM || align=right | 3.9 km || 
|-id=650 bgcolor=#fefefe
| 122650 ||  || — || September 3, 2000 || Socorro || LINEAR || V || align=right | 1.5 km || 
|-id=651 bgcolor=#fefefe
| 122651 ||  || — || September 3, 2000 || Socorro || LINEAR || — || align=right | 1.4 km || 
|-id=652 bgcolor=#E9E9E9
| 122652 ||  || — || September 3, 2000 || Socorro || LINEAR || — || align=right | 3.3 km || 
|-id=653 bgcolor=#E9E9E9
| 122653 ||  || — || September 3, 2000 || Socorro || LINEAR || — || align=right | 5.2 km || 
|-id=654 bgcolor=#E9E9E9
| 122654 ||  || — || September 3, 2000 || Socorro || LINEAR || — || align=right | 5.9 km || 
|-id=655 bgcolor=#E9E9E9
| 122655 ||  || — || September 4, 2000 || Anderson Mesa || LONEOS || — || align=right | 1.4 km || 
|-id=656 bgcolor=#E9E9E9
| 122656 ||  || — || September 4, 2000 || Anderson Mesa || LONEOS || MRX || align=right | 1.8 km || 
|-id=657 bgcolor=#E9E9E9
| 122657 ||  || — || September 4, 2000 || Anderson Mesa || LONEOS || — || align=right | 2.3 km || 
|-id=658 bgcolor=#E9E9E9
| 122658 ||  || — || September 4, 2000 || Kitt Peak || Spacewatch || — || align=right | 2.8 km || 
|-id=659 bgcolor=#E9E9E9
| 122659 ||  || — || September 5, 2000 || Anderson Mesa || LONEOS || — || align=right | 3.6 km || 
|-id=660 bgcolor=#E9E9E9
| 122660 ||  || — || September 5, 2000 || Anderson Mesa || LONEOS || EUN || align=right | 3.0 km || 
|-id=661 bgcolor=#fefefe
| 122661 ||  || — || September 5, 2000 || Anderson Mesa || LONEOS || — || align=right | 5.4 km || 
|-id=662 bgcolor=#E9E9E9
| 122662 ||  || — || September 5, 2000 || Anderson Mesa || LONEOS || HNS || align=right | 3.1 km || 
|-id=663 bgcolor=#E9E9E9
| 122663 ||  || — || September 5, 2000 || Anderson Mesa || LONEOS || — || align=right | 2.2 km || 
|-id=664 bgcolor=#E9E9E9
| 122664 ||  || — || September 5, 2000 || Anderson Mesa || LONEOS || MAR || align=right | 2.1 km || 
|-id=665 bgcolor=#fefefe
| 122665 ||  || — || September 5, 2000 || Anderson Mesa || LONEOS || — || align=right | 1.7 km || 
|-id=666 bgcolor=#E9E9E9
| 122666 ||  || — || September 5, 2000 || Anderson Mesa || LONEOS || — || align=right | 1.9 km || 
|-id=667 bgcolor=#E9E9E9
| 122667 ||  || — || September 5, 2000 || Anderson Mesa || LONEOS || — || align=right | 3.3 km || 
|-id=668 bgcolor=#E9E9E9
| 122668 ||  || — || September 5, 2000 || Anderson Mesa || LONEOS || — || align=right | 5.5 km || 
|-id=669 bgcolor=#E9E9E9
| 122669 ||  || — || September 5, 2000 || Anderson Mesa || LONEOS || — || align=right | 2.7 km || 
|-id=670 bgcolor=#E9E9E9
| 122670 ||  || — || September 5, 2000 || Anderson Mesa || LONEOS || ADE || align=right | 5.4 km || 
|-id=671 bgcolor=#E9E9E9
| 122671 ||  || — || September 5, 2000 || Anderson Mesa || LONEOS || — || align=right | 4.9 km || 
|-id=672 bgcolor=#E9E9E9
| 122672 ||  || — || September 5, 2000 || Anderson Mesa || LONEOS || — || align=right | 2.8 km || 
|-id=673 bgcolor=#E9E9E9
| 122673 ||  || — || September 5, 2000 || Anderson Mesa || LONEOS || EUN || align=right | 2.2 km || 
|-id=674 bgcolor=#E9E9E9
| 122674 ||  || — || September 5, 2000 || Anderson Mesa || LONEOS || MAR || align=right | 2.3 km || 
|-id=675 bgcolor=#E9E9E9
| 122675 ||  || — || September 5, 2000 || Anderson Mesa || LONEOS || — || align=right | 1.9 km || 
|-id=676 bgcolor=#E9E9E9
| 122676 ||  || — || September 6, 2000 || Socorro || LINEAR || — || align=right | 4.8 km || 
|-id=677 bgcolor=#E9E9E9
| 122677 ||  || — || September 6, 2000 || Socorro || LINEAR || INO || align=right | 2.0 km || 
|-id=678 bgcolor=#E9E9E9
| 122678 ||  || — || September 6, 2000 || Socorro || LINEAR || — || align=right | 2.4 km || 
|-id=679 bgcolor=#E9E9E9
| 122679 ||  || — || September 6, 2000 || Socorro || LINEAR || — || align=right | 2.8 km || 
|-id=680 bgcolor=#fefefe
| 122680 ||  || — || September 4, 2000 || Anderson Mesa || LONEOS || — || align=right | 3.1 km || 
|-id=681 bgcolor=#fefefe
| 122681 || 2000 SW || — || September 19, 2000 || Kitt Peak || Spacewatch || NYS || align=right | 1.8 km || 
|-id=682 bgcolor=#E9E9E9
| 122682 ||  || — || September 18, 2000 || Socorro || LINEAR || BRU || align=right | 5.9 km || 
|-id=683 bgcolor=#fefefe
| 122683 ||  || — || September 18, 2000 || Socorro || LINEAR || — || align=right | 10 km || 
|-id=684 bgcolor=#fefefe
| 122684 ||  || — || September 20, 2000 || Socorro || LINEAR || — || align=right | 1.7 km || 
|-id=685 bgcolor=#E9E9E9
| 122685 ||  || — || September 20, 2000 || Socorro || LINEAR || — || align=right | 3.4 km || 
|-id=686 bgcolor=#E9E9E9
| 122686 ||  || — || September 20, 2000 || Socorro || LINEAR || KRM || align=right | 4.7 km || 
|-id=687 bgcolor=#E9E9E9
| 122687 ||  || — || September 20, 2000 || Socorro || LINEAR || — || align=right | 3.1 km || 
|-id=688 bgcolor=#E9E9E9
| 122688 ||  || — || September 20, 2000 || Kitt Peak || Spacewatch || — || align=right | 2.2 km || 
|-id=689 bgcolor=#fefefe
| 122689 ||  || — || September 22, 2000 || Kitt Peak || Spacewatch || V || align=right | 1.3 km || 
|-id=690 bgcolor=#E9E9E9
| 122690 ||  || — || September 23, 2000 || Socorro || LINEAR || HNS || align=right | 2.1 km || 
|-id=691 bgcolor=#fefefe
| 122691 ||  || — || September 24, 2000 || Višnjan Observatory || K. Korlević || NYS || align=right | 1.1 km || 
|-id=692 bgcolor=#fefefe
| 122692 ||  || — || September 20, 2000 || Socorro || LINEAR || FLO || align=right | 1.7 km || 
|-id=693 bgcolor=#E9E9E9
| 122693 ||  || — || September 20, 2000 || Socorro || LINEAR || — || align=right | 1.4 km || 
|-id=694 bgcolor=#E9E9E9
| 122694 ||  || — || September 20, 2000 || Socorro || LINEAR || — || align=right | 1.9 km || 
|-id=695 bgcolor=#E9E9E9
| 122695 ||  || — || September 22, 2000 || Socorro || LINEAR || EUN || align=right | 2.1 km || 
|-id=696 bgcolor=#E9E9E9
| 122696 ||  || — || September 23, 2000 || Socorro || LINEAR || — || align=right | 3.0 km || 
|-id=697 bgcolor=#E9E9E9
| 122697 ||  || — || September 23, 2000 || Socorro || LINEAR || — || align=right | 2.1 km || 
|-id=698 bgcolor=#E9E9E9
| 122698 ||  || — || September 23, 2000 || Socorro || LINEAR || — || align=right | 2.6 km || 
|-id=699 bgcolor=#E9E9E9
| 122699 ||  || — || September 23, 2000 || Socorro || LINEAR || — || align=right | 4.5 km || 
|-id=700 bgcolor=#fefefe
| 122700 ||  || — || September 23, 2000 || Socorro || LINEAR || V || align=right | 1.4 km || 
|}

122701–122800 

|-bgcolor=#E9E9E9
| 122701 ||  || — || September 20, 2000 || Haleakala || NEAT || — || align=right | 1.6 km || 
|-id=702 bgcolor=#E9E9E9
| 122702 ||  || — || September 26, 2000 || Bisei SG Center || BATTeRS || — || align=right | 2.2 km || 
|-id=703 bgcolor=#E9E9E9
| 122703 ||  || — || September 23, 2000 || Socorro || LINEAR || NEM || align=right | 4.2 km || 
|-id=704 bgcolor=#E9E9E9
| 122704 ||  || — || September 24, 2000 || Socorro || LINEAR || — || align=right | 3.6 km || 
|-id=705 bgcolor=#E9E9E9
| 122705 ||  || — || September 24, 2000 || Socorro || LINEAR || PAD || align=right | 2.6 km || 
|-id=706 bgcolor=#E9E9E9
| 122706 ||  || — || September 24, 2000 || Socorro || LINEAR || MRX || align=right | 1.8 km || 
|-id=707 bgcolor=#E9E9E9
| 122707 ||  || — || September 24, 2000 || Socorro || LINEAR || — || align=right | 2.0 km || 
|-id=708 bgcolor=#fefefe
| 122708 ||  || — || September 24, 2000 || Socorro || LINEAR || V || align=right | 1.3 km || 
|-id=709 bgcolor=#d6d6d6
| 122709 ||  || — || September 24, 2000 || Socorro || LINEAR || KOR || align=right | 2.3 km || 
|-id=710 bgcolor=#E9E9E9
| 122710 ||  || — || September 24, 2000 || Socorro || LINEAR || — || align=right | 3.9 km || 
|-id=711 bgcolor=#E9E9E9
| 122711 ||  || — || September 24, 2000 || Socorro || LINEAR || KON || align=right | 3.6 km || 
|-id=712 bgcolor=#fefefe
| 122712 ||  || — || September 24, 2000 || Socorro || LINEAR || — || align=right | 1.3 km || 
|-id=713 bgcolor=#E9E9E9
| 122713 ||  || — || September 24, 2000 || Socorro || LINEAR || PAD || align=right | 3.1 km || 
|-id=714 bgcolor=#E9E9E9
| 122714 ||  || — || September 24, 2000 || Socorro || LINEAR || — || align=right | 1.8 km || 
|-id=715 bgcolor=#fefefe
| 122715 ||  || — || September 24, 2000 || Socorro || LINEAR || — || align=right | 1.6 km || 
|-id=716 bgcolor=#fefefe
| 122716 ||  || — || September 24, 2000 || Socorro || LINEAR || — || align=right | 3.5 km || 
|-id=717 bgcolor=#E9E9E9
| 122717 ||  || — || September 24, 2000 || Socorro || LINEAR || XIZ || align=right | 2.4 km || 
|-id=718 bgcolor=#E9E9E9
| 122718 ||  || — || September 24, 2000 || Socorro || LINEAR || — || align=right | 3.4 km || 
|-id=719 bgcolor=#fefefe
| 122719 ||  || — || September 24, 2000 || Socorro || LINEAR || V || align=right | 2.1 km || 
|-id=720 bgcolor=#E9E9E9
| 122720 ||  || — || September 24, 2000 || Socorro || LINEAR || — || align=right | 7.9 km || 
|-id=721 bgcolor=#E9E9E9
| 122721 ||  || — || September 24, 2000 || Socorro || LINEAR || — || align=right | 1.6 km || 
|-id=722 bgcolor=#E9E9E9
| 122722 ||  || — || September 24, 2000 || Socorro || LINEAR || NEM || align=right | 4.9 km || 
|-id=723 bgcolor=#fefefe
| 122723 ||  || — || September 24, 2000 || Socorro || LINEAR || V || align=right | 1.5 km || 
|-id=724 bgcolor=#fefefe
| 122724 ||  || — || September 24, 2000 || Socorro || LINEAR || — || align=right | 1.5 km || 
|-id=725 bgcolor=#fefefe
| 122725 ||  || — || September 24, 2000 || Socorro || LINEAR || — || align=right | 1.6 km || 
|-id=726 bgcolor=#fefefe
| 122726 ||  || — || September 26, 2000 || Črni Vrh || Črni Vrh || — || align=right | 9.9 km || 
|-id=727 bgcolor=#fefefe
| 122727 ||  || — || September 26, 2000 || Črni Vrh || Črni Vrh || NYS || align=right | 1.3 km || 
|-id=728 bgcolor=#E9E9E9
| 122728 ||  || — || September 26, 2000 || Črni Vrh || Črni Vrh || — || align=right | 3.9 km || 
|-id=729 bgcolor=#E9E9E9
| 122729 ||  || — || September 22, 2000 || Bergisch Gladbach || W. Bickel || — || align=right | 1.3 km || 
|-id=730 bgcolor=#fefefe
| 122730 ||  || — || September 22, 2000 || Socorro || LINEAR || SVE || align=right | 4.3 km || 
|-id=731 bgcolor=#E9E9E9
| 122731 ||  || — || September 22, 2000 || Socorro || LINEAR || — || align=right | 2.2 km || 
|-id=732 bgcolor=#E9E9E9
| 122732 ||  || — || September 23, 2000 || Socorro || LINEAR || ADE || align=right | 4.2 km || 
|-id=733 bgcolor=#C2FFFF
| 122733 ||  || — || September 23, 2000 || Socorro || LINEAR || L5slow || align=right | 15 km || 
|-id=734 bgcolor=#fefefe
| 122734 ||  || — || September 23, 2000 || Socorro || LINEAR || V || align=right | 1.2 km || 
|-id=735 bgcolor=#E9E9E9
| 122735 ||  || — || September 23, 2000 || Socorro || LINEAR || — || align=right | 1.6 km || 
|-id=736 bgcolor=#E9E9E9
| 122736 ||  || — || September 23, 2000 || Socorro || LINEAR || — || align=right | 2.5 km || 
|-id=737 bgcolor=#E9E9E9
| 122737 ||  || — || September 23, 2000 || Socorro || LINEAR || — || align=right | 1.8 km || 
|-id=738 bgcolor=#E9E9E9
| 122738 ||  || — || September 23, 2000 || Socorro || LINEAR || — || align=right | 1.6 km || 
|-id=739 bgcolor=#E9E9E9
| 122739 ||  || — || September 24, 2000 || Socorro || LINEAR || — || align=right | 3.4 km || 
|-id=740 bgcolor=#fefefe
| 122740 ||  || — || September 24, 2000 || Socorro || LINEAR || — || align=right | 1.8 km || 
|-id=741 bgcolor=#E9E9E9
| 122741 ||  || — || September 24, 2000 || Socorro || LINEAR || — || align=right | 4.5 km || 
|-id=742 bgcolor=#E9E9E9
| 122742 ||  || — || September 24, 2000 || Socorro || LINEAR || — || align=right | 2.6 km || 
|-id=743 bgcolor=#E9E9E9
| 122743 ||  || — || September 24, 2000 || Socorro || LINEAR || MAR || align=right | 1.8 km || 
|-id=744 bgcolor=#fefefe
| 122744 ||  || — || September 24, 2000 || Socorro || LINEAR || MAS || align=right | 1.1 km || 
|-id=745 bgcolor=#E9E9E9
| 122745 ||  || — || September 24, 2000 || Socorro || LINEAR || — || align=right | 3.7 km || 
|-id=746 bgcolor=#d6d6d6
| 122746 ||  || — || September 24, 2000 || Socorro || LINEAR || KOR || align=right | 3.0 km || 
|-id=747 bgcolor=#E9E9E9
| 122747 ||  || — || September 24, 2000 || Socorro || LINEAR || — || align=right | 2.2 km || 
|-id=748 bgcolor=#fefefe
| 122748 ||  || — || September 24, 2000 || Socorro || LINEAR || — || align=right | 1.2 km || 
|-id=749 bgcolor=#E9E9E9
| 122749 ||  || — || September 24, 2000 || Socorro || LINEAR || HOF || align=right | 5.1 km || 
|-id=750 bgcolor=#E9E9E9
| 122750 ||  || — || September 24, 2000 || Socorro || LINEAR || HEN || align=right | 1.6 km || 
|-id=751 bgcolor=#E9E9E9
| 122751 ||  || — || September 24, 2000 || Socorro || LINEAR || — || align=right | 1.4 km || 
|-id=752 bgcolor=#fefefe
| 122752 ||  || — || September 24, 2000 || Socorro || LINEAR || V || align=right | 1.6 km || 
|-id=753 bgcolor=#d6d6d6
| 122753 ||  || — || September 24, 2000 || Socorro || LINEAR || — || align=right | 3.6 km || 
|-id=754 bgcolor=#E9E9E9
| 122754 ||  || — || September 24, 2000 || Socorro || LINEAR || — || align=right | 4.1 km || 
|-id=755 bgcolor=#E9E9E9
| 122755 ||  || — || September 24, 2000 || Socorro || LINEAR || — || align=right | 1.3 km || 
|-id=756 bgcolor=#E9E9E9
| 122756 ||  || — || September 24, 2000 || Socorro || LINEAR || — || align=right | 1.6 km || 
|-id=757 bgcolor=#E9E9E9
| 122757 ||  || — || September 24, 2000 || Socorro || LINEAR || — || align=right | 1.8 km || 
|-id=758 bgcolor=#E9E9E9
| 122758 ||  || — || September 24, 2000 || Socorro || LINEAR || — || align=right | 1.3 km || 
|-id=759 bgcolor=#d6d6d6
| 122759 ||  || — || September 24, 2000 || Socorro || LINEAR || — || align=right | 5.3 km || 
|-id=760 bgcolor=#E9E9E9
| 122760 ||  || — || September 24, 2000 || Socorro || LINEAR || — || align=right | 1.9 km || 
|-id=761 bgcolor=#d6d6d6
| 122761 ||  || — || September 24, 2000 || Socorro || LINEAR || KOR || align=right | 2.3 km || 
|-id=762 bgcolor=#fefefe
| 122762 ||  || — || September 24, 2000 || Socorro || LINEAR || NYS || align=right | 1.2 km || 
|-id=763 bgcolor=#E9E9E9
| 122763 ||  || — || September 24, 2000 || Socorro || LINEAR || — || align=right | 4.1 km || 
|-id=764 bgcolor=#fefefe
| 122764 ||  || — || September 24, 2000 || Socorro || LINEAR || NYS || align=right | 1.3 km || 
|-id=765 bgcolor=#E9E9E9
| 122765 ||  || — || September 24, 2000 || Socorro || LINEAR || — || align=right | 2.2 km || 
|-id=766 bgcolor=#E9E9E9
| 122766 ||  || — || September 24, 2000 || Socorro || LINEAR || PAD || align=right | 4.4 km || 
|-id=767 bgcolor=#fefefe
| 122767 ||  || — || September 24, 2000 || Socorro || LINEAR || MAS || align=right | 1.2 km || 
|-id=768 bgcolor=#E9E9E9
| 122768 ||  || — || September 24, 2000 || Socorro || LINEAR || — || align=right | 2.7 km || 
|-id=769 bgcolor=#E9E9E9
| 122769 ||  || — || September 24, 2000 || Socorro || LINEAR || — || align=right | 1.7 km || 
|-id=770 bgcolor=#E9E9E9
| 122770 ||  || — || September 24, 2000 || Socorro || LINEAR || — || align=right | 3.4 km || 
|-id=771 bgcolor=#d6d6d6
| 122771 ||  || — || September 24, 2000 || Socorro || LINEAR || — || align=right | 2.6 km || 
|-id=772 bgcolor=#E9E9E9
| 122772 ||  || — || September 24, 2000 || Socorro || LINEAR || — || align=right | 4.6 km || 
|-id=773 bgcolor=#E9E9E9
| 122773 ||  || — || September 24, 2000 || Socorro || LINEAR || — || align=right | 4.4 km || 
|-id=774 bgcolor=#fefefe
| 122774 ||  || — || September 24, 2000 || Socorro || LINEAR || NYS || align=right | 1.3 km || 
|-id=775 bgcolor=#E9E9E9
| 122775 ||  || — || September 24, 2000 || Socorro || LINEAR || — || align=right | 3.9 km || 
|-id=776 bgcolor=#fefefe
| 122776 ||  || — || September 24, 2000 || Socorro || LINEAR || V || align=right | 1.3 km || 
|-id=777 bgcolor=#fefefe
| 122777 ||  || — || September 24, 2000 || Socorro || LINEAR || ERI || align=right | 4.1 km || 
|-id=778 bgcolor=#fefefe
| 122778 ||  || — || September 24, 2000 || Socorro || LINEAR || — || align=right | 1.7 km || 
|-id=779 bgcolor=#fefefe
| 122779 ||  || — || September 24, 2000 || Socorro || LINEAR || — || align=right | 1.8 km || 
|-id=780 bgcolor=#E9E9E9
| 122780 ||  || — || September 24, 2000 || Socorro || LINEAR || — || align=right | 2.5 km || 
|-id=781 bgcolor=#fefefe
| 122781 ||  || — || September 24, 2000 || Socorro || LINEAR || — || align=right | 1.6 km || 
|-id=782 bgcolor=#E9E9E9
| 122782 ||  || — || September 24, 2000 || Socorro || LINEAR || — || align=right | 3.7 km || 
|-id=783 bgcolor=#E9E9E9
| 122783 ||  || — || September 24, 2000 || Socorro || LINEAR || — || align=right | 1.4 km || 
|-id=784 bgcolor=#fefefe
| 122784 ||  || — || September 24, 2000 || Socorro || LINEAR || — || align=right | 2.9 km || 
|-id=785 bgcolor=#E9E9E9
| 122785 ||  || — || September 24, 2000 || Socorro || LINEAR || — || align=right | 3.1 km || 
|-id=786 bgcolor=#E9E9E9
| 122786 ||  || — || September 25, 2000 || Socorro || LINEAR || EUN || align=right | 2.2 km || 
|-id=787 bgcolor=#fefefe
| 122787 ||  || — || September 22, 2000 || Socorro || LINEAR || — || align=right | 2.0 km || 
|-id=788 bgcolor=#E9E9E9
| 122788 ||  || — || September 23, 2000 || Socorro || LINEAR || — || align=right | 2.3 km || 
|-id=789 bgcolor=#E9E9E9
| 122789 ||  || — || September 23, 2000 || Socorro || LINEAR || — || align=right | 1.9 km || 
|-id=790 bgcolor=#E9E9E9
| 122790 ||  || — || September 23, 2000 || Socorro || LINEAR || JUN || align=right | 3.1 km || 
|-id=791 bgcolor=#E9E9E9
| 122791 ||  || — || September 23, 2000 || Socorro || LINEAR || — || align=right | 2.2 km || 
|-id=792 bgcolor=#fefefe
| 122792 ||  || — || September 23, 2000 || Socorro || LINEAR || — || align=right | 3.2 km || 
|-id=793 bgcolor=#E9E9E9
| 122793 ||  || — || September 23, 2000 || Socorro || LINEAR || — || align=right | 4.3 km || 
|-id=794 bgcolor=#E9E9E9
| 122794 ||  || — || September 23, 2000 || Socorro || LINEAR || EUN || align=right | 2.1 km || 
|-id=795 bgcolor=#fefefe
| 122795 ||  || — || September 23, 2000 || Socorro || LINEAR || V || align=right | 1.8 km || 
|-id=796 bgcolor=#E9E9E9
| 122796 ||  || — || September 23, 2000 || Socorro || LINEAR || — || align=right | 5.7 km || 
|-id=797 bgcolor=#fefefe
| 122797 ||  || — || September 23, 2000 || Socorro || LINEAR || — || align=right | 1.9 km || 
|-id=798 bgcolor=#fefefe
| 122798 ||  || — || September 23, 2000 || Socorro || LINEAR || — || align=right | 1.6 km || 
|-id=799 bgcolor=#E9E9E9
| 122799 ||  || — || September 23, 2000 || Socorro || LINEAR || — || align=right | 1.6 km || 
|-id=800 bgcolor=#E9E9E9
| 122800 ||  || — || September 23, 2000 || Socorro || LINEAR || — || align=right | 1.8 km || 
|}

122801–122900 

|-bgcolor=#E9E9E9
| 122801 ||  || — || September 23, 2000 || Socorro || LINEAR || — || align=right | 2.7 km || 
|-id=802 bgcolor=#fefefe
| 122802 ||  || — || September 23, 2000 || Socorro || LINEAR || — || align=right | 2.3 km || 
|-id=803 bgcolor=#E9E9E9
| 122803 ||  || — || September 23, 2000 || Socorro || LINEAR || — || align=right | 3.8 km || 
|-id=804 bgcolor=#E9E9E9
| 122804 ||  || — || September 23, 2000 || Socorro || LINEAR || — || align=right | 2.3 km || 
|-id=805 bgcolor=#E9E9E9
| 122805 ||  || — || September 23, 2000 || Socorro || LINEAR || — || align=right | 4.4 km || 
|-id=806 bgcolor=#E9E9E9
| 122806 ||  || — || September 23, 2000 || Socorro || LINEAR || — || align=right | 3.8 km || 
|-id=807 bgcolor=#E9E9E9
| 122807 ||  || — || September 23, 2000 || Socorro || LINEAR || — || align=right | 1.9 km || 
|-id=808 bgcolor=#fefefe
| 122808 ||  || — || September 23, 2000 || Socorro || LINEAR || V || align=right | 1.3 km || 
|-id=809 bgcolor=#E9E9E9
| 122809 ||  || — || September 23, 2000 || Socorro || LINEAR || HOF || align=right | 5.1 km || 
|-id=810 bgcolor=#E9E9E9
| 122810 ||  || — || September 23, 2000 || Socorro || LINEAR || — || align=right | 4.9 km || 
|-id=811 bgcolor=#E9E9E9
| 122811 ||  || — || September 24, 2000 || Socorro || LINEAR || — || align=right | 2.7 km || 
|-id=812 bgcolor=#fefefe
| 122812 ||  || — || September 24, 2000 || Socorro || LINEAR || V || align=right | 1.2 km || 
|-id=813 bgcolor=#E9E9E9
| 122813 ||  || — || September 24, 2000 || Socorro || LINEAR || — || align=right | 4.0 km || 
|-id=814 bgcolor=#fefefe
| 122814 ||  || — || September 24, 2000 || Socorro || LINEAR || NYS || align=right | 3.0 km || 
|-id=815 bgcolor=#fefefe
| 122815 ||  || — || September 24, 2000 || Socorro || LINEAR || — || align=right | 4.2 km || 
|-id=816 bgcolor=#d6d6d6
| 122816 ||  || — || September 24, 2000 || Socorro || LINEAR || — || align=right | 3.5 km || 
|-id=817 bgcolor=#E9E9E9
| 122817 ||  || — || September 24, 2000 || Socorro || LINEAR || — || align=right | 2.0 km || 
|-id=818 bgcolor=#E9E9E9
| 122818 ||  || — || September 24, 2000 || Socorro || LINEAR || — || align=right | 5.3 km || 
|-id=819 bgcolor=#E9E9E9
| 122819 ||  || — || September 24, 2000 || Socorro || LINEAR || — || align=right | 3.7 km || 
|-id=820 bgcolor=#E9E9E9
| 122820 ||  || — || September 24, 2000 || Socorro || LINEAR || RAF || align=right | 2.1 km || 
|-id=821 bgcolor=#E9E9E9
| 122821 ||  || — || September 24, 2000 || Socorro || LINEAR || — || align=right | 2.3 km || 
|-id=822 bgcolor=#E9E9E9
| 122822 ||  || — || September 24, 2000 || Socorro || LINEAR || — || align=right | 2.1 km || 
|-id=823 bgcolor=#fefefe
| 122823 ||  || — || September 24, 2000 || Socorro || LINEAR || SUL || align=right | 3.0 km || 
|-id=824 bgcolor=#fefefe
| 122824 ||  || — || September 24, 2000 || Socorro || LINEAR || NYS || align=right | 3.8 km || 
|-id=825 bgcolor=#fefefe
| 122825 ||  || — || September 24, 2000 || Socorro || LINEAR || V || align=right | 1.2 km || 
|-id=826 bgcolor=#E9E9E9
| 122826 ||  || — || September 24, 2000 || Socorro || LINEAR || — || align=right | 1.7 km || 
|-id=827 bgcolor=#fefefe
| 122827 ||  || — || September 24, 2000 || Socorro || LINEAR || — || align=right | 3.6 km || 
|-id=828 bgcolor=#fefefe
| 122828 ||  || — || September 24, 2000 || Socorro || LINEAR || — || align=right | 3.0 km || 
|-id=829 bgcolor=#fefefe
| 122829 ||  || — || September 24, 2000 || Socorro || LINEAR || NYS || align=right | 1.1 km || 
|-id=830 bgcolor=#fefefe
| 122830 ||  || — || September 24, 2000 || Socorro || LINEAR || V || align=right | 1.6 km || 
|-id=831 bgcolor=#E9E9E9
| 122831 ||  || — || September 24, 2000 || Socorro || LINEAR || — || align=right | 2.4 km || 
|-id=832 bgcolor=#fefefe
| 122832 ||  || — || September 24, 2000 || Socorro || LINEAR || — || align=right | 1.7 km || 
|-id=833 bgcolor=#E9E9E9
| 122833 ||  || — || September 24, 2000 || Socorro || LINEAR || — || align=right | 1.8 km || 
|-id=834 bgcolor=#fefefe
| 122834 ||  || — || September 24, 2000 || Socorro || LINEAR || NYS || align=right | 1.3 km || 
|-id=835 bgcolor=#E9E9E9
| 122835 ||  || — || September 24, 2000 || Socorro || LINEAR || — || align=right | 2.4 km || 
|-id=836 bgcolor=#fefefe
| 122836 ||  || — || September 24, 2000 || Socorro || LINEAR || — || align=right | 1.3 km || 
|-id=837 bgcolor=#fefefe
| 122837 ||  || — || September 24, 2000 || Socorro || LINEAR || — || align=right | 2.5 km || 
|-id=838 bgcolor=#E9E9E9
| 122838 ||  || — || September 24, 2000 || Socorro || LINEAR || — || align=right | 2.5 km || 
|-id=839 bgcolor=#E9E9E9
| 122839 ||  || — || September 24, 2000 || Socorro || LINEAR || — || align=right | 4.4 km || 
|-id=840 bgcolor=#E9E9E9
| 122840 ||  || — || September 24, 2000 || Socorro || LINEAR || JUN || align=right | 5.4 km || 
|-id=841 bgcolor=#E9E9E9
| 122841 ||  || — || September 24, 2000 || Socorro || LINEAR || — || align=right | 2.1 km || 
|-id=842 bgcolor=#E9E9E9
| 122842 ||  || — || September 24, 2000 || Socorro || LINEAR || — || align=right | 6.9 km || 
|-id=843 bgcolor=#E9E9E9
| 122843 ||  || — || September 24, 2000 || Socorro || LINEAR || — || align=right | 4.7 km || 
|-id=844 bgcolor=#E9E9E9
| 122844 ||  || — || September 24, 2000 || Socorro || LINEAR || — || align=right | 1.7 km || 
|-id=845 bgcolor=#E9E9E9
| 122845 ||  || — || September 24, 2000 || Socorro || LINEAR || — || align=right | 2.1 km || 
|-id=846 bgcolor=#E9E9E9
| 122846 ||  || — || September 24, 2000 || Socorro || LINEAR || — || align=right | 2.1 km || 
|-id=847 bgcolor=#fefefe
| 122847 ||  || — || September 24, 2000 || Socorro || LINEAR || — || align=right | 1.8 km || 
|-id=848 bgcolor=#fefefe
| 122848 ||  || — || September 24, 2000 || Socorro || LINEAR || — || align=right | 2.2 km || 
|-id=849 bgcolor=#E9E9E9
| 122849 ||  || — || September 24, 2000 || Socorro || LINEAR || — || align=right | 3.1 km || 
|-id=850 bgcolor=#E9E9E9
| 122850 ||  || — || September 22, 2000 || Socorro || LINEAR || POS || align=right | 4.4 km || 
|-id=851 bgcolor=#E9E9E9
| 122851 ||  || — || September 22, 2000 || Socorro || LINEAR || — || align=right | 2.8 km || 
|-id=852 bgcolor=#fefefe
| 122852 ||  || — || September 22, 2000 || Socorro || LINEAR || LCI || align=right | 2.7 km || 
|-id=853 bgcolor=#E9E9E9
| 122853 ||  || — || September 22, 2000 || Socorro || LINEAR || — || align=right | 4.6 km || 
|-id=854 bgcolor=#E9E9E9
| 122854 ||  || — || September 22, 2000 || Socorro || LINEAR || MAR || align=right | 2.1 km || 
|-id=855 bgcolor=#E9E9E9
| 122855 ||  || — || September 22, 2000 || Socorro || LINEAR || HNS || align=right | 2.0 km || 
|-id=856 bgcolor=#E9E9E9
| 122856 ||  || — || September 22, 2000 || Socorro || LINEAR || JUN || align=right | 2.6 km || 
|-id=857 bgcolor=#E9E9E9
| 122857 ||  || — || September 22, 2000 || Socorro || LINEAR || — || align=right | 4.1 km || 
|-id=858 bgcolor=#E9E9E9
| 122858 ||  || — || September 22, 2000 || Socorro || LINEAR || — || align=right | 1.9 km || 
|-id=859 bgcolor=#E9E9E9
| 122859 ||  || — || September 22, 2000 || Socorro || LINEAR || MIT || align=right | 4.6 km || 
|-id=860 bgcolor=#C2FFFF
| 122860 ||  || — || September 23, 2000 || Socorro || LINEAR || L5 || align=right | 18 km || 
|-id=861 bgcolor=#E9E9E9
| 122861 ||  || — || September 23, 2000 || Socorro || LINEAR || — || align=right | 2.9 km || 
|-id=862 bgcolor=#C2FFFF
| 122862 ||  || — || September 23, 2000 || Socorro || LINEAR || L5 || align=right | 13 km || 
|-id=863 bgcolor=#fefefe
| 122863 ||  || — || September 23, 2000 || Socorro || LINEAR || — || align=right | 1.5 km || 
|-id=864 bgcolor=#E9E9E9
| 122864 ||  || — || September 23, 2000 || Socorro || LINEAR || — || align=right | 3.8 km || 
|-id=865 bgcolor=#fefefe
| 122865 ||  || — || September 23, 2000 || Socorro || LINEAR || — || align=right | 1.8 km || 
|-id=866 bgcolor=#fefefe
| 122866 ||  || — || September 23, 2000 || Socorro || LINEAR || — || align=right | 1.7 km || 
|-id=867 bgcolor=#E9E9E9
| 122867 ||  || — || September 23, 2000 || Socorro || LINEAR || — || align=right | 2.4 km || 
|-id=868 bgcolor=#E9E9E9
| 122868 ||  || — || September 23, 2000 || Socorro || LINEAR || — || align=right | 3.8 km || 
|-id=869 bgcolor=#E9E9E9
| 122869 ||  || — || September 23, 2000 || Socorro || LINEAR || EUN || align=right | 2.9 km || 
|-id=870 bgcolor=#E9E9E9
| 122870 ||  || — || September 23, 2000 || Socorro || LINEAR || — || align=right | 2.0 km || 
|-id=871 bgcolor=#fefefe
| 122871 ||  || — || September 23, 2000 || Socorro || LINEAR || SUL || align=right | 4.8 km || 
|-id=872 bgcolor=#fefefe
| 122872 ||  || — || September 23, 2000 || Socorro || LINEAR || — || align=right | 1.6 km || 
|-id=873 bgcolor=#E9E9E9
| 122873 ||  || — || September 23, 2000 || Socorro || LINEAR || — || align=right | 1.6 km || 
|-id=874 bgcolor=#E9E9E9
| 122874 ||  || — || September 23, 2000 || Socorro || LINEAR || — || align=right | 3.6 km || 
|-id=875 bgcolor=#E9E9E9
| 122875 ||  || — || September 23, 2000 || Socorro || LINEAR || — || align=right | 4.4 km || 
|-id=876 bgcolor=#E9E9E9
| 122876 ||  || — || September 23, 2000 || Socorro || LINEAR || — || align=right | 4.7 km || 
|-id=877 bgcolor=#fefefe
| 122877 ||  || — || September 23, 2000 || Socorro || LINEAR || V || align=right | 1.8 km || 
|-id=878 bgcolor=#E9E9E9
| 122878 ||  || — || September 23, 2000 || Socorro || LINEAR || — || align=right | 4.8 km || 
|-id=879 bgcolor=#E9E9E9
| 122879 ||  || — || September 23, 2000 || Socorro || LINEAR || — || align=right | 3.5 km || 
|-id=880 bgcolor=#fefefe
| 122880 ||  || — || September 24, 2000 || Socorro || LINEAR || — || align=right | 1.8 km || 
|-id=881 bgcolor=#fefefe
| 122881 ||  || — || September 24, 2000 || Socorro || LINEAR || NYS || align=right | 1.2 km || 
|-id=882 bgcolor=#E9E9E9
| 122882 ||  || — || September 24, 2000 || Socorro || LINEAR || — || align=right | 2.0 km || 
|-id=883 bgcolor=#E9E9E9
| 122883 ||  || — || September 24, 2000 || Socorro || LINEAR || — || align=right | 1.5 km || 
|-id=884 bgcolor=#E9E9E9
| 122884 ||  || — || September 24, 2000 || Socorro || LINEAR || — || align=right | 3.1 km || 
|-id=885 bgcolor=#E9E9E9
| 122885 ||  || — || September 24, 2000 || Socorro || LINEAR || — || align=right | 1.3 km || 
|-id=886 bgcolor=#E9E9E9
| 122886 ||  || — || September 24, 2000 || Socorro || LINEAR || — || align=right | 1.4 km || 
|-id=887 bgcolor=#E9E9E9
| 122887 ||  || — || September 24, 2000 || Socorro || LINEAR || XIZ || align=right | 2.8 km || 
|-id=888 bgcolor=#E9E9E9
| 122888 ||  || — || September 24, 2000 || Socorro || LINEAR || MAR || align=right | 2.2 km || 
|-id=889 bgcolor=#E9E9E9
| 122889 ||  || — || September 24, 2000 || Socorro || LINEAR || XIZ || align=right | 2.6 km || 
|-id=890 bgcolor=#E9E9E9
| 122890 ||  || — || September 24, 2000 || Socorro || LINEAR || — || align=right | 4.2 km || 
|-id=891 bgcolor=#E9E9E9
| 122891 ||  || — || September 24, 2000 || Socorro || LINEAR || — || align=right | 2.5 km || 
|-id=892 bgcolor=#E9E9E9
| 122892 ||  || — || September 24, 2000 || Socorro || LINEAR || — || align=right | 2.3 km || 
|-id=893 bgcolor=#E9E9E9
| 122893 ||  || — || September 24, 2000 || Socorro || LINEAR || GEF || align=right | 2.9 km || 
|-id=894 bgcolor=#E9E9E9
| 122894 ||  || — || September 24, 2000 || Socorro || LINEAR || — || align=right | 2.3 km || 
|-id=895 bgcolor=#E9E9E9
| 122895 ||  || — || September 24, 2000 || Socorro || LINEAR || — || align=right | 1.7 km || 
|-id=896 bgcolor=#d6d6d6
| 122896 ||  || — || September 24, 2000 || Socorro || LINEAR || — || align=right | 8.5 km || 
|-id=897 bgcolor=#E9E9E9
| 122897 ||  || — || September 24, 2000 || Socorro || LINEAR || — || align=right | 4.5 km || 
|-id=898 bgcolor=#E9E9E9
| 122898 ||  || — || September 27, 2000 || Socorro || LINEAR || — || align=right | 2.5 km || 
|-id=899 bgcolor=#d6d6d6
| 122899 ||  || — || September 27, 2000 || Socorro || LINEAR || BRA || align=right | 3.0 km || 
|-id=900 bgcolor=#E9E9E9
| 122900 ||  || — || September 27, 2000 || Socorro || LINEAR || — || align=right | 2.4 km || 
|}

122901–123000 

|-bgcolor=#E9E9E9
| 122901 ||  || — || September 19, 2000 || Haleakala || NEAT || HEN || align=right | 2.0 km || 
|-id=902 bgcolor=#E9E9E9
| 122902 ||  || — || September 21, 2000 || Haleakala || NEAT || — || align=right | 2.1 km || 
|-id=903 bgcolor=#E9E9E9
| 122903 ||  || — || September 23, 2000 || Socorro || LINEAR || — || align=right | 4.8 km || 
|-id=904 bgcolor=#E9E9E9
| 122904 ||  || — || September 23, 2000 || Socorro || LINEAR || — || align=right | 3.9 km || 
|-id=905 bgcolor=#E9E9E9
| 122905 ||  || — || September 23, 2000 || Socorro || LINEAR || — || align=right | 3.2 km || 
|-id=906 bgcolor=#E9E9E9
| 122906 ||  || — || September 23, 2000 || Socorro || LINEAR || — || align=right | 3.7 km || 
|-id=907 bgcolor=#E9E9E9
| 122907 ||  || — || September 23, 2000 || Socorro || LINEAR || RAF || align=right | 4.9 km || 
|-id=908 bgcolor=#E9E9E9
| 122908 ||  || — || September 23, 2000 || Socorro || LINEAR || RAF || align=right | 1.4 km || 
|-id=909 bgcolor=#E9E9E9
| 122909 ||  || — || September 23, 2000 || Socorro || LINEAR || — || align=right | 4.9 km || 
|-id=910 bgcolor=#fefefe
| 122910 ||  || — || September 23, 2000 || Socorro || LINEAR || — || align=right | 2.2 km || 
|-id=911 bgcolor=#E9E9E9
| 122911 ||  || — || September 23, 2000 || Socorro || LINEAR || — || align=right | 2.0 km || 
|-id=912 bgcolor=#E9E9E9
| 122912 ||  || — || September 23, 2000 || Socorro || LINEAR || — || align=right | 5.2 km || 
|-id=913 bgcolor=#E9E9E9
| 122913 ||  || — || September 23, 2000 || Socorro || LINEAR || — || align=right | 1.8 km || 
|-id=914 bgcolor=#E9E9E9
| 122914 ||  || — || September 23, 2000 || Socorro || LINEAR || EUN || align=right | 3.3 km || 
|-id=915 bgcolor=#E9E9E9
| 122915 ||  || — || September 27, 2000 || Socorro || LINEAR || — || align=right | 4.0 km || 
|-id=916 bgcolor=#E9E9E9
| 122916 ||  || — || September 28, 2000 || Socorro || LINEAR || BRU || align=right | 7.9 km || 
|-id=917 bgcolor=#E9E9E9
| 122917 ||  || — || September 28, 2000 || Socorro || LINEAR || — || align=right | 5.1 km || 
|-id=918 bgcolor=#E9E9E9
| 122918 ||  || — || September 28, 2000 || Socorro || LINEAR || — || align=right | 3.0 km || 
|-id=919 bgcolor=#E9E9E9
| 122919 ||  || — || September 28, 2000 || Socorro || LINEAR || EUN || align=right | 3.0 km || 
|-id=920 bgcolor=#E9E9E9
| 122920 ||  || — || September 28, 2000 || Socorro || LINEAR || — || align=right | 1.9 km || 
|-id=921 bgcolor=#E9E9E9
| 122921 ||  || — || September 28, 2000 || Socorro || LINEAR || — || align=right | 3.4 km || 
|-id=922 bgcolor=#E9E9E9
| 122922 ||  || — || September 28, 2000 || Socorro || LINEAR || — || align=right | 2.8 km || 
|-id=923 bgcolor=#E9E9E9
| 122923 ||  || — || September 28, 2000 || Socorro || LINEAR || — || align=right | 1.8 km || 
|-id=924 bgcolor=#fefefe
| 122924 ||  || — || September 28, 2000 || Socorro || LINEAR || — || align=right | 1.6 km || 
|-id=925 bgcolor=#E9E9E9
| 122925 ||  || — || September 28, 2000 || Socorro || LINEAR || — || align=right | 2.3 km || 
|-id=926 bgcolor=#fefefe
| 122926 ||  || — || September 28, 2000 || Socorro || LINEAR || — || align=right | 2.2 km || 
|-id=927 bgcolor=#d6d6d6
| 122927 ||  || — || September 28, 2000 || Socorro || LINEAR || — || align=right | 5.2 km || 
|-id=928 bgcolor=#fefefe
| 122928 ||  || — || September 28, 2000 || Socorro || LINEAR || V || align=right | 1.3 km || 
|-id=929 bgcolor=#d6d6d6
| 122929 ||  || — || September 28, 2000 || Socorro || LINEAR || — || align=right | 4.2 km || 
|-id=930 bgcolor=#E9E9E9
| 122930 ||  || — || September 19, 2000 || Haleakala || NEAT || — || align=right | 1.6 km || 
|-id=931 bgcolor=#fefefe
| 122931 ||  || — || September 20, 2000 || Haleakala || NEAT || V || align=right | 1.4 km || 
|-id=932 bgcolor=#fefefe
| 122932 ||  || — || September 20, 2000 || Haleakala || NEAT || — || align=right | 1.4 km || 
|-id=933 bgcolor=#E9E9E9
| 122933 ||  || — || September 20, 2000 || Kitt Peak || Spacewatch || DOR || align=right | 5.5 km || 
|-id=934 bgcolor=#E9E9E9
| 122934 ||  || — || September 21, 2000 || Kitt Peak || Spacewatch || HEN || align=right | 2.0 km || 
|-id=935 bgcolor=#E9E9E9
| 122935 ||  || — || September 21, 2000 || Kitt Peak || Spacewatch || — || align=right | 2.6 km || 
|-id=936 bgcolor=#fefefe
| 122936 ||  || — || September 21, 2000 || Haleakala || NEAT || — || align=right | 1.8 km || 
|-id=937 bgcolor=#fefefe
| 122937 ||  || — || September 21, 2000 || Haleakala || NEAT || — || align=right | 3.7 km || 
|-id=938 bgcolor=#E9E9E9
| 122938 ||  || — || September 22, 2000 || Haleakala || NEAT || — || align=right | 2.0 km || 
|-id=939 bgcolor=#E9E9E9
| 122939 ||  || — || September 24, 2000 || Socorro || LINEAR || HOF || align=right | 5.1 km || 
|-id=940 bgcolor=#fefefe
| 122940 ||  || — || September 24, 2000 || Socorro || LINEAR || V || align=right | 1.6 km || 
|-id=941 bgcolor=#E9E9E9
| 122941 ||  || — || September 24, 2000 || Socorro || LINEAR || — || align=right | 4.5 km || 
|-id=942 bgcolor=#E9E9E9
| 122942 ||  || — || September 24, 2000 || Socorro || LINEAR || — || align=right | 1.2 km || 
|-id=943 bgcolor=#E9E9E9
| 122943 ||  || — || September 24, 2000 || Socorro || LINEAR || AGN || align=right | 2.1 km || 
|-id=944 bgcolor=#E9E9E9
| 122944 ||  || — || September 24, 2000 || Socorro || LINEAR || — || align=right | 4.5 km || 
|-id=945 bgcolor=#E9E9E9
| 122945 ||  || — || September 24, 2000 || Socorro || LINEAR || — || align=right | 3.7 km || 
|-id=946 bgcolor=#fefefe
| 122946 ||  || — || September 24, 2000 || Socorro || LINEAR || NYS || align=right | 4.1 km || 
|-id=947 bgcolor=#fefefe
| 122947 ||  || — || September 24, 2000 || Socorro || LINEAR || — || align=right | 1.4 km || 
|-id=948 bgcolor=#E9E9E9
| 122948 ||  || — || September 24, 2000 || Socorro || LINEAR || — || align=right | 3.6 km || 
|-id=949 bgcolor=#E9E9E9
| 122949 ||  || — || September 24, 2000 || Socorro || LINEAR || — || align=right | 3.3 km || 
|-id=950 bgcolor=#E9E9E9
| 122950 ||  || — || September 24, 2000 || Socorro || LINEAR || — || align=right | 3.9 km || 
|-id=951 bgcolor=#fefefe
| 122951 ||  || — || September 24, 2000 || Socorro || LINEAR || — || align=right | 1.7 km || 
|-id=952 bgcolor=#fefefe
| 122952 ||  || — || September 24, 2000 || Socorro || LINEAR || — || align=right | 1.4 km || 
|-id=953 bgcolor=#E9E9E9
| 122953 ||  || — || September 24, 2000 || Socorro || LINEAR || — || align=right | 3.6 km || 
|-id=954 bgcolor=#E9E9E9
| 122954 ||  || — || September 24, 2000 || Socorro || LINEAR || — || align=right | 1.6 km || 
|-id=955 bgcolor=#E9E9E9
| 122955 ||  || — || September 24, 2000 || Socorro || LINEAR || — || align=right | 3.6 km || 
|-id=956 bgcolor=#E9E9E9
| 122956 ||  || — || September 24, 2000 || Socorro || LINEAR || — || align=right | 3.3 km || 
|-id=957 bgcolor=#E9E9E9
| 122957 ||  || — || September 24, 2000 || Socorro || LINEAR || — || align=right | 4.7 km || 
|-id=958 bgcolor=#fefefe
| 122958 ||  || — || September 24, 2000 || Socorro || LINEAR || — || align=right | 3.1 km || 
|-id=959 bgcolor=#E9E9E9
| 122959 ||  || — || September 25, 2000 || Socorro || LINEAR || RAF || align=right | 1.5 km || 
|-id=960 bgcolor=#E9E9E9
| 122960 ||  || — || September 25, 2000 || Socorro || LINEAR || — || align=right | 2.3 km || 
|-id=961 bgcolor=#E9E9E9
| 122961 ||  || — || September 26, 2000 || Socorro || LINEAR || — || align=right | 1.3 km || 
|-id=962 bgcolor=#C2FFFF
| 122962 ||  || — || September 26, 2000 || Socorro || LINEAR || L5 || align=right | 17 km || 
|-id=963 bgcolor=#fefefe
| 122963 ||  || — || September 26, 2000 || Socorro || LINEAR || — || align=right | 1.7 km || 
|-id=964 bgcolor=#E9E9E9
| 122964 ||  || — || September 26, 2000 || Socorro || LINEAR || DOR || align=right | 5.2 km || 
|-id=965 bgcolor=#E9E9E9
| 122965 ||  || — || September 26, 2000 || Socorro || LINEAR || HNS || align=right | 2.4 km || 
|-id=966 bgcolor=#E9E9E9
| 122966 ||  || — || September 26, 2000 || Socorro || LINEAR || — || align=right | 2.8 km || 
|-id=967 bgcolor=#E9E9E9
| 122967 ||  || — || September 26, 2000 || Socorro || LINEAR || RAF || align=right | 1.8 km || 
|-id=968 bgcolor=#E9E9E9
| 122968 ||  || — || September 26, 2000 || Socorro || LINEAR || — || align=right | 2.9 km || 
|-id=969 bgcolor=#E9E9E9
| 122969 ||  || — || September 27, 2000 || Socorro || LINEAR || — || align=right | 3.2 km || 
|-id=970 bgcolor=#E9E9E9
| 122970 ||  || — || September 27, 2000 || Socorro || LINEAR || — || align=right | 1.7 km || 
|-id=971 bgcolor=#E9E9E9
| 122971 ||  || — || September 27, 2000 || Socorro || LINEAR || — || align=right | 2.5 km || 
|-id=972 bgcolor=#E9E9E9
| 122972 ||  || — || September 28, 2000 || Socorro || LINEAR || — || align=right | 2.6 km || 
|-id=973 bgcolor=#E9E9E9
| 122973 ||  || — || September 28, 2000 || Socorro || LINEAR || — || align=right | 3.2 km || 
|-id=974 bgcolor=#E9E9E9
| 122974 ||  || — || September 28, 2000 || Socorro || LINEAR || — || align=right | 2.1 km || 
|-id=975 bgcolor=#E9E9E9
| 122975 ||  || — || September 28, 2000 || Socorro || LINEAR || — || align=right | 1.6 km || 
|-id=976 bgcolor=#fefefe
| 122976 ||  || — || September 28, 2000 || Socorro || LINEAR || MAS || align=right | 1.5 km || 
|-id=977 bgcolor=#fefefe
| 122977 ||  || — || September 28, 2000 || Socorro || LINEAR || — || align=right | 1.7 km || 
|-id=978 bgcolor=#fefefe
| 122978 ||  || — || September 22, 2000 || Socorro || LINEAR || V || align=right | 1.2 km || 
|-id=979 bgcolor=#fefefe
| 122979 ||  || — || September 24, 2000 || Socorro || LINEAR || — || align=right | 1.4 km || 
|-id=980 bgcolor=#E9E9E9
| 122980 ||  || — || September 26, 2000 || Socorro || LINEAR || — || align=right | 4.7 km || 
|-id=981 bgcolor=#E9E9E9
| 122981 ||  || — || September 27, 2000 || Socorro || LINEAR || WIT || align=right | 1.9 km || 
|-id=982 bgcolor=#E9E9E9
| 122982 ||  || — || September 22, 2000 || Socorro || LINEAR || — || align=right | 2.9 km || 
|-id=983 bgcolor=#fefefe
| 122983 ||  || — || September 24, 2000 || Socorro || LINEAR || NYS || align=right | 3.1 km || 
|-id=984 bgcolor=#E9E9E9
| 122984 ||  || — || September 24, 2000 || Socorro || LINEAR || — || align=right | 1.8 km || 
|-id=985 bgcolor=#fefefe
| 122985 ||  || — || September 24, 2000 || Socorro || LINEAR || — || align=right | 1.8 km || 
|-id=986 bgcolor=#E9E9E9
| 122986 ||  || — || September 24, 2000 || Socorro || LINEAR || MAR || align=right | 2.2 km || 
|-id=987 bgcolor=#fefefe
| 122987 ||  || — || September 24, 2000 || Socorro || LINEAR || NYS || align=right | 2.2 km || 
|-id=988 bgcolor=#fefefe
| 122988 ||  || — || September 24, 2000 || Socorro || LINEAR || MAS || align=right | 1.9 km || 
|-id=989 bgcolor=#E9E9E9
| 122989 ||  || — || September 24, 2000 || Socorro || LINEAR || — || align=right | 3.5 km || 
|-id=990 bgcolor=#fefefe
| 122990 ||  || — || September 24, 2000 || Socorro || LINEAR || — || align=right | 3.4 km || 
|-id=991 bgcolor=#E9E9E9
| 122991 ||  || — || September 24, 2000 || Socorro || LINEAR || WIT || align=right | 1.7 km || 
|-id=992 bgcolor=#fefefe
| 122992 ||  || — || September 24, 2000 || Socorro || LINEAR || V || align=right | 1.9 km || 
|-id=993 bgcolor=#E9E9E9
| 122993 ||  || — || September 24, 2000 || Socorro || LINEAR || MAR || align=right | 2.0 km || 
|-id=994 bgcolor=#E9E9E9
| 122994 ||  || — || September 24, 2000 || Socorro || LINEAR || — || align=right | 4.8 km || 
|-id=995 bgcolor=#E9E9E9
| 122995 ||  || — || September 24, 2000 || Socorro || LINEAR || — || align=right | 2.1 km || 
|-id=996 bgcolor=#E9E9E9
| 122996 ||  || — || September 24, 2000 || Socorro || LINEAR || — || align=right | 2.1 km || 
|-id=997 bgcolor=#E9E9E9
| 122997 ||  || — || September 24, 2000 || Socorro || LINEAR || — || align=right | 1.6 km || 
|-id=998 bgcolor=#E9E9E9
| 122998 ||  || — || September 24, 2000 || Socorro || LINEAR || — || align=right | 1.9 km || 
|-id=999 bgcolor=#fefefe
| 122999 ||  || — || September 24, 2000 || Socorro || LINEAR || NYS || align=right | 3.5 km || 
|-id=000 bgcolor=#fefefe
| 123000 ||  || — || September 24, 2000 || Socorro || LINEAR || MAS || align=right | 1.3 km || 
|}

References

External links 
 Discovery Circumstances: Numbered Minor Planets (120001)–(125000) (IAU Minor Planet Center)

0122